= List of NAMs elected in the 2017 Gambian parliamentary election =

Fifth National Assembly of the Gambia
←	4th National Assembly	6th National Assembly	→

Overview
- Legislative body: National Assembly of the Gambia
- Election: 2017 Gambian parliamentary election
- Government: Government of Adama Barrow

National Assembly
- Members: 58
- Speaker: Mariam Jack-Denton
- Deputy Speaker: Momodou L. K. Sanneh
- Majority Leader: Kebba K. Barrow
- Minority Leader: Samba Jallow

The fifth National Assembly of the Gambia was the legislature of the Gambia elected at the 2017 parliamentary election and serving until the 2022 parliamentary election.

The 2017 election saw each of the National Assembly's 53 directly elected constituencies return one NAM, as well as each of the five nominated NAMs being appointed by the President of the Gambia, Adama Barrow. It resulted in an UDP majority of 14 (including nominated members), with 22 opposition NAMs in total.

== National Assembly composition ==
Below is a graphical representation of the National Assembly following the 2017 election, with 31 UDP NAMs, five APRC NAMs, five NRP NAMs, five GDC NAMs, four PDOIS NAMs, two PPP NAMs, one independent NAM and five nominated NAMs (all of whom are members of the UDP).

Party	Votes	%	Seats	+/–
United Democratic Party	142,146	37.47	31	New
Gambia Democratic Congress	65,938	17.38	5	New
Alliance for Patriotic Reorientation and Construction	60,331	15.91	5	–38
People's Democratic Organisation for Independence and Socialism	33,894	8.94	4	New
National Reconciliation Party	23,755	6.26	5	+4
People's Progressive Party	9,503	2.51	2	New
Gambia Moral Congress	4,458	1.18	0	New
National Convention Party	1,773	0.47	0	New
Gambia Party for Democracy and Progress	1,271	0.34	0	New
Independents	36,251	9.56	1	–3
Appointed seats			5	–
Total	379,320	100.00	58	+5
Total votes	379,320	–		
Registered voters/turnout	886,578	42.78		
Source: IEC

== Constituency changes ==
There was a difference in the number of constituencies between the 2012 and the 2017 elections. In 2015, the Independent Electoral Commission demarcated four constituencies, Kombo North, Kombo Central, Serekunda East, and Serekunda Central, into nine constituencies. Kombo North became Sanneh Menterreng, Old Yundum and Busumbala; Kombo Central became Brikama North and Brikama South; Serekunda East became Tallinding Kunjang and Latrikunda Sabiji; Serekunda Central became Serekunda and Bundungka Kunda.

== List of NAMs elected in 2017 ==
Constituency	Member	Party	Notes
Bakau	Assan Touray	UDP	Seat gain, incumbent Kalifa Jammeh stood down
Banjul Central	Muhammed Ndow	PPP	Seat gain, defeated incumbent Abdoulie Saine
Banjul North	Ousman Silla	PDOIS	Seat gain, incumbent Alhagi Sillah stood down
Banjul South	Fatoumatta Njai	PPP	Seat gain, defeated incumbent Baboucarr S. Nyang
Basse	Muhammed Magassy	Ind	Seat held
Brikama North	Alhagie S. Darboe	UDP	Seat gain, new constituency
Brikama South	Lamin J. Sanneh	UDP	Seat gain, new constituency
Bundungka Kunda	Bakary Njie	UDP	Seat gain, new constituency
Busumbala	Saikouba Jarju	UDP	Seat gain, new constituency
Central Baddibu	Sulayman Saho	UDP	Seat gain, incumbent Samba Cham stood down
Foni Bintang Karanai	Ebrima Solo Jammeh	APRC	Seat held
Foni Bondali	Kaddy Camara	APRC	Seat held, incumbent Matarr Kujabi stood down
Foni Brefet	Sunkary Badjie	APRC	Seat held, incumbent Bintanding Jarju stood down
Foni Jarrol	Alhagie Sankung Jammeh	APRC	Seat held
Foni Kansala	Musa Amul Nyassi	APRC	Seat held, incumbent Buba A. Bojang stood down
Illiassa	Dembo K. M. Camara	UDP	Seat gain, incumbent Lamin Kebba Jammeh stood down
Jamara	Alhagie H. Sowe	GDC	Seat gain, defeated incumbent Habiboulie K. Jawo
Janjanbureh	Momodou Ceesay	UDP	Seat gain, defeated incumbent Ebrima M. Sarjo
Jarra Central	Kebba Jallow	GDC	Seat gain, incumbent Lamin Hydara stood down
Jarra East	Sainey Touray	UDP	Seat gain, incumbent Bafaye Saidy Khan stood down
Jarra West	Kajali Fofana	UDP	Seat gain, incumbent Njie Darboe stood down
Jeshwang	Alhagie Drammeh	UDP	Seat gain, incumbent Haddy Nyang-Jagne stood down
Jokadu	Salifu Jawo	GDC	Seat gain, incumbent Amadou O. Khan stood down
Kantora	Billay G. Tunkara	UDP	Seat gain, incumbent Saikou Susso stood down
Kiang Central	Bakary Camara	UDP	Seat gain, incumbent Baboucarr S. Fadera stood down
Kiang East	Yaya Gassama	UDP	Seat gain, incumbent Bora B. Mass stood down
Kiang West	Fakebba N. L. Colley	UDP	Seat gain, incumbent Menata Njie stood down
Kombo East	Lamin N. F. Conta	UDP	Seat gain, seat vacant
Kombo South	Kebba K. Barrow	UDP	Seat gain, incumbent Abdou Colley stood down, elected Majority Leader
Latrikunda Sabijie	Saikou Marong	UDP	Seat gain, new constituency
Lower Badibu	Alhagie Jawara	UDP	Seat gain, incumbent Ablie Suku Singhateh stood down
Lower Fulladu West	Alhagie Darboe	UDP	Seat gain, defeated incumbent Omar Tobb
Lower Niumi	Matarr Jeng	UDP	Seat gain, incumbent Sheriff M. Hydara stood down
Lower Saloum	Sainey Jawara	NRP	Seat held, incumbent Modou Bamba Gaye stood down
Naimina Dankuna	Samba Jallow	NRP	Seat held, re-elected Minority Leader
Naimina East	Omar Ceesay	GDC	Seat gain, incumbent Foday A. Jallow stood down
Niamina West	Demba Sowe	GDC	Seat gain, incumbent Lamin Jadama stood down
Niani	Alhagie F. B. Sillah	UDP	Seat gain, seat vacant
Nianija	Amadou Camara	NRP	Seat gain, defeated incumbent Habsana Jallow
Old Yundum	Abdoulie Ceesay	UDP	Seat gain, new constituency
Sabach Sanjal	Ousman Toray	NRP	Seat gain, incumbent Ousman Bah stood down
Sami	Alfusainey Ceesay	UDP	Seat gain, incumbent Ousman Njie stood down
Sandu	Muhammed Mahanera	UDP	Seat gain, incumbent Abdoulie K. Jawla stood down
Sanneh Menterreng	Baba Galleh Jallow	UDP	Seat gain, new constituency
Serekunda Central	Halifa Sallah	PDOIS	Seat gain, new constituency
Serekunda West	Madi Ceesay	UDP	Seat gain, incumbent Sulayman Joof stood down
Tallinding Kujng	Fatou K. Jawara	UDP	Seat gain, new constituency
Tumana	Foday N. M. Drammeh	UDP	Seat gain, incumbent Netty Baldeh stood down
Upper Fulladu West	Dawda Kawsu Jawara	UDP	Seat gain, incumbent Ahmad Malick Njie stood down
Upper Niumi	Omar Darboe	UDP	Seat gain, defeated incumbent Cherno O. Jallow
Upper Saloum	Alhagie Mbow	NRP	Seat gain, defeated incumbent Sainey Mbye
Wuli East	Suwaibou Touray	PDOIS	Seat gain, incumbent Saidou V. Sabally stood down
Wuli West	Sidia Jatta	PDOIS	Seat gain, incumbent Kassuma Jallow stood down
Nominated	Mariam Jack-Denton	UDP	Speaker - Elected by MPs (Unopposed)
Nominated	Kumba Jaiteh	UDP	
Nominated	Ndey Yassin Secka-Sallah	CS	
Nominated	Momodou L. K. Sanneh	UDP	Deputy Speaker - Elected by MPs (Unopposed)
Nominated	Majanko Samusa	NCP	
