= List of NAMs elected in the 2022 Gambian parliamentary election =

Sixth National Assembly of the Gambia
←	5th National Assembly

Overview
- Legislative body: National Assembly of the Gambia
- Term: 17 April 2022 –
- Election: 2022 Gambian parliamentary election
- Government: Government of Adama Barrow

National Assembly
- Members: 58
- Speaker: Fabakary Jatta
- Deputy Speaker: Seedy Njie
- Majority Leader: Billay G. Tunkara
- Minority Leader: Alhagie S. Darboe

The sixth National Assembly of the Gambia is the current legislature of the Gambia, elected at the 2022 parliamentary election and serving until the 2027 parliamentary election.

== National Assembly composition ==
The composition of the assembly is as follows: 18 NPP NAMs, 15 UDP NAMs, 4 NRP NAMs, 2 PDOIS NAMs, 2 APRC NAMs, 12 independent NAMs and five nominated NAMs (4 NPP NAMs and 1 APRC NAM).

== List of NAMs elected in 2022 ==
Constituency	Member	Party	Notes
Kantora	Bilay G. Tunkara	NPP	
Brikama North	Alhagie S. Darboe	UDP	
Foni Jarrol	Kebba T. Sanneh	Ind	
Lower Baddibu	Kemo Gassama	UDP	
Niani	Omar Jobe	Ind	
Bakau	Assan Touray	UDP	
Upper Fulladu West	Bakary Kora	NPP	
Tallinding Kunjang	Musa Badjie	UDP	
Banjul North	Modou Lamin B. Bah	UDP	
Busumbala	Muhammed Kanteh	Ind	
Banjul South	Fatoumata Njai	Ind	
Sami	Alfusainey Ceesay	UDP	
Jeshwang	Sheriff Sarr	APRC	
Upper Saloum	Alhagie Mbowe	NRP	
Kombo South	Kebba K. Barrow	UDP	
Nianija	Amadou Camara	NRP	
Sanimentereng	Fatou Cham	UDP	
Kiang Central	Yunusa N. Bah	Ind	
Bundungka Kunda	Sulayman Jammeh	APRC	
Niamina Dankunku	Samba Jallow	NRP	
Kiang West	Lamin Ceesay	UDP	
Tumana	Nfally M. Kora	NPP	
Serekunda	Musa Cham	PDOIS	
Jarra West	Alieu Baldeh	NPP	
Jimara	Essa Conteh	NPP	
Kombo East	Abdou Sowe	UDP	
Brikama South	Lamin J. Sanneh	UDP	
Lower Niumi	Tamsir Cham	NPP	
Foni Bintang	Bakary K. Badjie	Ind	
Old Yundum	Abdoulie Ceesay	NPP	
Janjanbureh	Omar Jammeh	Ind	
Basse	Saikou Bah	NPP	
Sandu District	Ebrima Jaiteh	NPP	
Banjul Central	Abdoulie Njai	Ind	
Niamina East	Dawda Jeng	NPP	
Upper Niumi	Omar Darboe	NPP	
Sabach Sanjal	Alagie B. Ceesay	Ind	
Latrikunda Sabiji	Yahya Sanyang	UDP	
Lower Saloum	Sainey Jawara	NRP	
Jarra East	Haruna Barry	NPP	
Jokadu	Salifu Jawo	NPP	
Wuli West	Nfamara Sabally	NPP	
Central Baddibu	Sulayman Saho	UDP	
Foni Brefet	Amie Colley	Ind	
Kiang East	Yaya Gassama	UDP	
Jarra Central	Kebba Jallow	NPP	
Serrekunda West	Madi Ceesay	UDP	
Niamina West	Birom Sowe	NPP	
Lower Fulladu West	Gibbi Mballow	NPP	
Foni Kansala	Almameh Gibba	Ind	
Foni Bondali	Pa Dembo Sanneh	Ind	
ILLIASA	Sankung Dampha	NPP	
Wuli East	Suwaibou Touray	PDOIS	
Nominated	Fabakary Jatta	APRC	Elected Speaker
Nominated	Seedy Njie	NPP	Elected Deputy Speaker
Nominated	Maimuna Ceesay	NPP	
Nominated	Kebba Lang Fofana	NPP	
Nominated	Fatoumata Jawara	NPP	
