= List of NAMs elected in the 2012 Gambian parliamentary election =

Fourth National Assembly of the Gambia
←	3rd National Assembly	5th National Assembly	→

Overview
- Legislative body: National Assembly of the Gambia
- Election: 2012 Gambian parliamentary election
- Government: Government of Yahya Jammeh; Government of Adama Barrow

National Assembly
- Members: 53
- Speaker: Abdoulie Bojang
- Deputy Speaker: Fatou Mbye
- Majority Leader: Fabakary Jatta
- Minority Leader: Samba Jallow

The fourth National Assembly of the Gambia was the legislature of the Gambia, elected at the 2012 parliamentary election and serving until the 2017 parliamentary election.

The 2012, election saw each of the Assembly's 48 directly-elected constituencies return one NAM, as well as each of the five nominated NAMs being appointed by the President of the Gambia, Yahya Jammeh. It resulted in an APRC majority of 48, with only one opposition NAM, Samba Jallow, being elected, as well as four independents.

== National Assembly composition ==
Below is a graphical representation of the National Assembly following the 2012 election, with 48 APRC NAMs, one NRP NAM, and four independent NAMs.

== List of NAMs elected in 2012 ==
Constituency	Member	Party	Notes
Bakau	Kalifa Jammeh	APRC	
Banjul Central	Abdoulie Saine	APRC	
Banjul North	Alhagi Sillah	APRC	
Banjul South	Baboucarr S. Nyang	APRC	
Basse	Muhammed Magassy	Ind	
Central Baddibu	Samba Cham	APRC	
Foni Bintang Karanai	Ebrima Solo Jammeh	APRC	
Foni Bondali	Matarr Kujabi	APRC	
Foni Brefet	Bintanding Jarju	APRC	
Foni Jarrol	Borry Kolley	APRC	
Foni Kansala	Buba A. Bojang	APRC	
Illiassa	Lamin Kebba Jammeh	APRC	
Jamara	Habiboulie K. Jawo	APRC	
Janjanbureh	Foday Jibani Manka	APRC	
Jarra Central	Lamin Hydara	APRC	
Jarra East	Bafaye Saidy Khan	APRC	
Jarra West	Njie Darboe	APRC	
Jeshwang	Haddy Nyang-Jagne	APRC	
Jokadu	Amadou O. Khan	APRC	
Kantora	Saikou Susso	APRC	
Kiang Central	Baboucarr S. Fadera	APRC	
Kiang East	Bora B. Mass	APRC	
Kiang West	Yahya Dibba	APRC	
Kombo Central	Buba Ayi Sanneh	Ind	
Kombo East	Alhassana Bojang	APRC	
Kombo North	Pa Lamin Jatta	APRC	
Kombo South	Abdou Colley	APRC	
Lower Badibu	Ablie Suku Singhateh	APRC	
Lower Fulladu West	Omar Tobb	Ind	
Lower Niumi	Sheriff M. Hydara	APRC	
Lower Saloum	Pa Malick Ceesay	APRC	
Naimina Dankuna	Samba Jallow	NRP	Elected Minority Leader
Naimina East	Foday A. Jallow	APRC	
Niamina West	Lamin Jadama	APRC	
Niani	Demba B. T. Sambou	Ind	
Nianija	Habsana Jallow	APRC	
Sabach Sanjal	Ousman Bah	APRC	
Sami	Ousman Njie	APRC	
Sandu	Abdoulie K. Jawla	APRC	
Serekunda Central	Ousman Sainey Jaiteh	APRC	
Serekunda East	Fabakary Jatta	APRC	Re-elected Majority Leader
Serekunda West	Sulayman Joof	APRC	
Tumana	Netty Baldeh	APRC	
Upper Fulladu West	Ahmad Malick Njie	APRC	
Upper Niumi	Cherno O. Jallow	APRC	
Upper Saloum	Sainey Mbye	APRC	
Wuli East	Saidou V. Sabally	APRC	
Wuli West	Kassuma Jallow	APRC	
Nominated	Abdoulie Bojang	APRC	Re-elected Speaker
Nominated	Fatou Mbye	APRC	Re-elected Deputy Speaker
Nominated	Seedy Njie	APRC	
Nominated	Lamin Saine	APRC	
Nominated	Babou Gaye Sonko	APRC	

== Changes ==
=== By-elections ===
#	Constituency	Incumbent				Date of by-election	Winner	
#	Constituency	Name	Party	Date seat vacated	Cause of vacation	Date of by-election	Name	Party
1	Kiang West	Yahya Dibba	APRC	5 September 2013	Expelled	5 December 2013	Menata Njie	APRC
2	Foni Jarrol	Borry Kolley	APRC	12 October 2013	Expelled	27 December 2013 (uncontested)	Sankung Jammeh	APRC
3	Janjanbureh	Foday Jibani Manka	APRC	30 December 2014	Death	12 March 2015	Ebrima M. Sarjo	APRC
4	Lower Saloum	Pa Malick Ceesay	APRC	11 May 2015	Expelled	6 August 2015	Modou Bamba	NRP
5	Niani	Demba B. T. Sambou	Ind	26 September 2016	Expelled	Not held	—N/a	
6	Kombo East	Alhassana Bojang	APRC	23 November 2016	Death	Not held	—N/a	
7	Nominated	Seedy Njie	APRC	9 January 2017	Appointed as minister	Not held	—N/a	
