= 2027 Gambian parliamentary election =

- 10 April 2027
- 53 of the 58 seats in the National Assembly; 29 seats needed for a majority
Party	Leader	Current seats
NPP	Adama Barrow	18
UDP	Ousainou Darboe	15
PDOIS	Sidia Jatta	2
APRC	Fabakary Jatta	2
NRP	Samba Jallow	4
Independents	–	12
Incumbent Speaker of the National Assembly
Fabakary Jatta; APRC

Parliamentary elections are scheduled to be held in The Gambia on 10 April 2027.

== Electoral system ==
The 58 members of the National Assembly consist of 53 members elected from single-member constituencies by first-past-the-post voting and five members appointed by the President, including the Speaker and their deputies.
