= Politics of the Gambia =

Politics of The Gambia takes place within the framework of a unitary presidential republic, whereby the president of the Gambia is both head of state and head of government, and of a multi-party system. Executive power is exercised by the government, and legislative power is vested in both the government and parliaments.

National laws made from the capital city and by the national government are implemented for the entire country but local governmental authorities are allowed to make by-laws. As a unitary state, laws from the capital city are made for the entire country but local governmental authorities are allowed to make by-laws Though the A National Policy for Decentralization and Local Development program, the Gambia is currently going through the process of decentralisation since the late 1980's-early 1990's.

The 1970 constitution of The Gambia, which divided the government into independent executive, legislative, and judicial branches, was suspended after the 1994 military coup. As part of the transition process, the Armed Forces Provisional Ruling Council (AFPRC) established the Constitution Review Commission (CRC) through decree in March 1995. In accordance with the timetable for the transition to a democratically elected government, the commission drafted a new constitution for The Gambia which was approved by referendum in August 1996. The constitution provides for a presidential system, a unicameral legislature, an independent judiciary, and the protection of human rights.

Historically, The Gambia was one of Africa's most stable democracies. The 1994 military coup led to the semi-authoritarian regime of Yahya Jammeh who held power until he was defeated during the 2016 Gambian presidential election.

== Political conditions ==
Before the coup d'état in July 1994, The Gambia was one of the oldest existing multi-party democracies in Africa. It had conducted freely contested elections every 5 years since independence. The coup led to the start of the semi-authoritarian Yahya Jammeh regime After the military coup, politicians from deposed President Jawara's People's Progressive Party (PPP) and other senior government officials were banned from participating in politics until July 2001.

The People's Progressive Party (PPP) project preparation plan, headed by former president Jawara, had dominated Gambian politics for nearly 30 years. The last elections under the PPP regime were held in April 1992.

Following the coup, a presidential election took place in September 1996, in which retired Col. Yahya A.J.J. Jammeh won 56% of the vote. The legislative elections held in January 1997 were dominated by the Alliance for Patriotic Reorientation and Construction (APRC, the new incarnation of AFPRC), which captured 33 out of 45 seats. In July 2001, the ban on Jawara-era political parties and politicians was lifted. Four registered opposition parties participated in the 18 October 2001 presidential election, which the incumbent, President Yahya Jammeh, won with almost 53% of the votes. The APRC maintained its strong majority in the National Assembly in legislative elections held in January 2002, particularly after the main opposition United Democratic Party (UDP) boycotted the legislative elections.

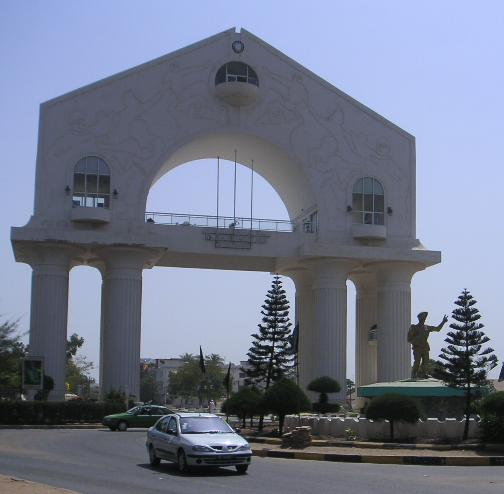
Arch 22 Monument commemorating the 1994 coup

In 2005 the political scenario was changed, as five opposition parties united under the umbrella of the National Alliance for Democracy and Development (NADD). NADD thus represented virtually all political opposition forces in the country. Following the registration of NADD, the High Court ruled that dual party membership was unconstitutional, and as NADD had been registered as a political party all four opposition MPs were dismissed from the National Assembly. By-elections were held on 29 September, in which NADD retained three of the four seats. On 15 November the same year, three high-ranking NADD leaders (including the Leader of Opposition in the National Assembly, Halifa Sallah) were arrested on the grounds of subversion.

On 21 and 22 March 2006, amid tensions preceding the 2006 presidential elections, an alleged planned military coup was uncovered. President Yahya Jammeh was forced to return from a trip to Mauritania, many suspected army officials were arrested, and prominent army officials, including the army chief of staff, fled the country. There are claims circulating that this whole event was fabricated by the President incumbent for his own devious purposes—however, the veracity of these claims is not known, as no corroborating evidence has as yet been brought forward. It is doubtful whether the full truth will ever be known, however, as anyone with any evidence would not be likely to come forward with it in light of the poor human rights record of the National Intelligence Agency, and their well-known penchant for torturing and detaining indefinitely anyone who speaks up against the Government.

The next presidential election took place on 22 September 2006. The nominations for party presidential candidates were held on 28 August 2006, amid reports of the Government intimidating and unfairly detaining Opposition members and sympathisers, and of using the machinery of state (including the national media arm of the Government, GRTS), to gain an unfair advantage during political campaigns. These reports follow a widely publicised signing of a Memorandum of Understanding between the Government and Opposition parties, initiated by the Nigerian President Olusegun Obasanjo during a recent visit to the country. Incumbent president, Yahya Jammeh, was reelected.

On 31 December 2014, a coup was attempted when a military deserter along with supporters attacked the presidential palace. The coup failed and the alleged ringleader, Lamin Sanneh, was amongst those killed by forces loyal to Jammeh.

Following the 1 December 2016 elections, the elections commission declared Adama Barrow as the elected president who won the presidential election to take over the Nation from the former president. Jammeh, who had ruled for 22 years, first announced he would step down after losing the 2016 election before declaring the results void and calling for a new vote, sparking a constitutional crisis and leading to an invasion by an ECOWAS coalition. On 20 January 2017, Jammeh announced that he had agreed to step down and would leave the country allowing Barrow to take up office. On 4 December 2021, Gambian President Adama Barrow won re-election in the presidential election. Opposition candidates rejected the results because of unspecified irregularities.

== Executive branch ==
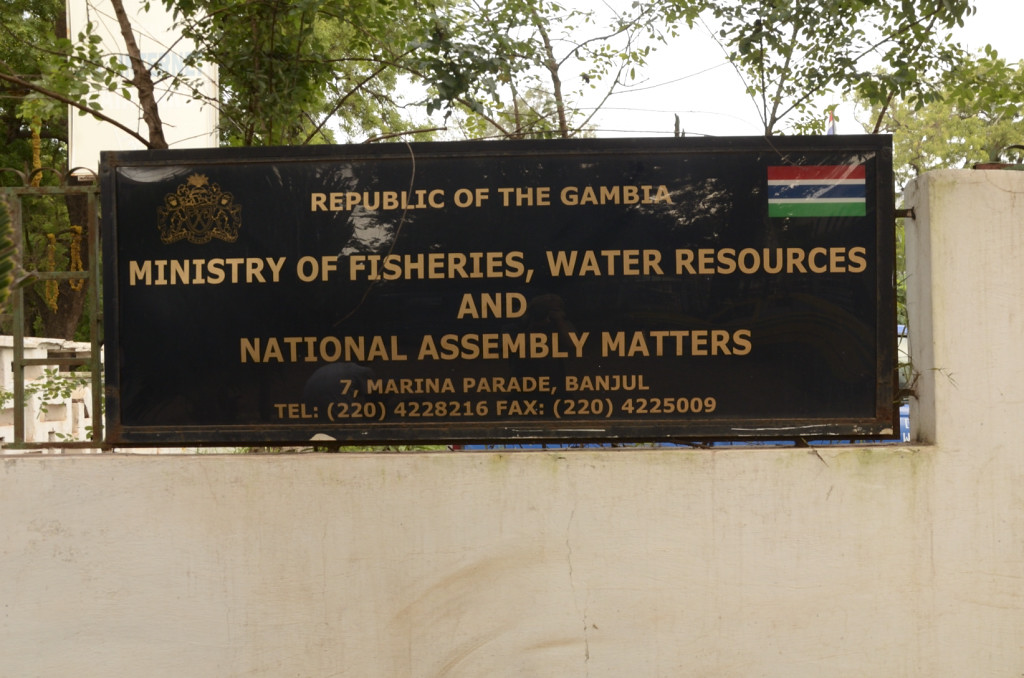
A government ministry signboard

Main office-holders
Office	Name	Party	Since
President	Adama Barrow	Independent	19 January 2017
Vice-President	Muhammad B.S. Jallow	Independent	15 March 2019

The President is elected by popular vote for a five-year term; the number of terms is not restricted. The President appoints the members of the Cabinet.

== Legislative branch ==
The National Assembly has 53 members, 48 members elected for a five-year term, and 4 members appointed. The Gambia was effectively a one party dominant state when the Alliance for Patriotic Reorientation and Construction was in power. Opposition parties were allowed but were widely considered to have no real chance of gaining power.

== Judicial branch ==
Supreme Court of the Gambia (since 1998).

Until 1998, there was a right of appeal from the Court of Appeal of The Gambia to the Judicial Committee of the Privy Council in London.

The last case from The Gambia to be decided by the Judicial Committee of the Privy Council was 'West Coast Air Limited v. Gambia Civil Aviation Authority and Others U.K.P.C. 39 (15 September 1998). West Coast Air Limited contested the Gambia Civil Aviation Authority's rulings in this matter, claiming that several of the decisions were illegal and harmful to their company's operations.

== Political parties and elections ==
=== Presidential elections ===
Candidate	Party	Votes	%
Adama Barrow	National People's Party	457,519	53.23
Ousainou Darboe	United Democratic Party	238,253	27.72
Mama Kandeh	Gambia Democratic Congress	105,902	12.32
Halifa Sallah	PDOIS	32,435	3.77
Essa M. Faal	Independent	17,206	2.00
Abdoulie Ebrima Jammeh	National Union Party	8,252	0.96
Total		859,567	100.00
Total votes		859,567	–
Registered voters/turnout		962,157	89.34
Source: IEC

=== Parliamentary elections ===
Party	Votes	%	Seats	+/–
National People's Party	143,826	29.19	18	New
United Democratic Party	138,176	28.04	15	–16
Gambia Democratic Congress	33,882	6.88	0	–5
People's Democratic Organisation for Independence and Socialism	24,683	5.01	2	–2
Alliance for Patriotic Reorientation and Construction	15,710	3.19	2	–3
National Reconciliation Party	14,153	2.87	4	–1
Citizens' Alliance	8,682	1.76	0	New
Gambia Moral Congress	2,531	0.51	0	0
National Unity Party	1,257	0.26	0	New
People's Progressive Party	1,168	0.24	0	–2
Gambia for All	1,151	0.23	0	New
All Peoples Party	294	0.06	0	New
Independents	107,232	21.76	12	+11
Appointed seats			5	0
Total	492,745	100.00	58	0
Total votes	492,745	–		
Registered voters/turnout	962,157	51.21		
Source: IEC

== Administrative divisions ==
Local government in The Gambia varies. The capital city, Banjul, has an elected town council. Outside of the capital, five rural regions exist (Lower River, Central River, North Bank, Upper River, Western), each with their own elected council. Each regional council has its own treasury and is responsible for local government services. Tribal chiefs retain traditional powers authorised by customary law in some instances.

== International organisation participation ==
The Gambia is a member of these international organisations:

ACP, AfDB, Commonwealth of Nations CCC, ECA, ECOWAS, FAO, G-77, IBRD, ICAO, ICFTU, ICRM, IDA, IDB, IFAD, IFC, IFRCS, ILO, IMF, IMO, Intelsat (nonsignatory user), Interpol, IOC, ITU, NAM, Shelter Afrique-A regional housing institution owned by 42 African Countries OAU, (Now replaced by the African Union abbreviated AU) OIC, OPCW, UN, UNCTAD, UNESCO, UNIDO, UPU, WCL, WFTU, WHO, WIPO, WMO, WToO, WTrO.
