= Halifa Sallah =

Gambian politician (born 1953)

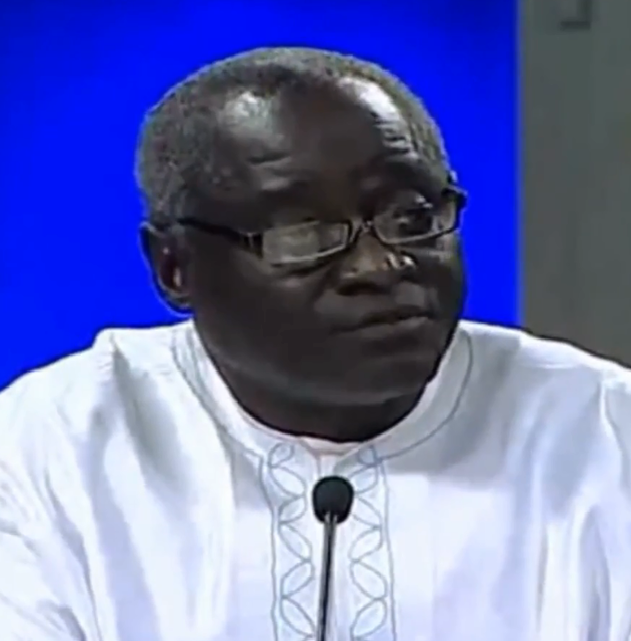

Special Advisor to the President on Governance
- In office 17 February 2017 – March 2017
- President: Adama Barrow

National Assembly Minority Leader
- In office 17 January 2002 – 25 January 2007
- Preceded by: Kemesseng Jammeh
- Succeeded by: Momodou L. K. Sanneh

National Assembly Member
- Incumbent
- Assumed office 6 April 2017
- Preceded by: Ousman Sainey Jaiteh
- Constituency: Serekunda
- In office 17 January 2002 – 25 January 2007
- Preceded by: Office Established
- Succeeded by: Fabakary Jatta
- Constituency: Serekunda Central

Secretary-General of the People's Democratic Organisation for Independence and Socialism
- Incumbent
- Assumed office August 1987
- Preceded by: Office Established

Personal details
- Born: 1953 (age 72–73) Serekunda, the Gambia
- Party: PDOIS
- Other political affiliations: NADD; Coalition 2016

Halifa Sallah (born 1953) is a Gambian politician and former National Assembly member for Serrekunda Constituency. He currently serves as the secretary-general of the People's Democratic Organisation for Independence and Socialism (PDOIS). He served as a spokesman and advisor to President Adama Barrow from during the 2016 presidential election campaign until March 2017.

Sallah co-founded PDOIS in 1986, and was elected as its secretary-general in 1987. He has been a major contributor to Foroyaa, the party's newspaper. He contested elections for the House of Representatives in 1987 and 1992, and was an opposer of the Yahya Jammeh regime. He stood unsuccessfully for the National Assembly in 1997, but was elected in 2002, serving until 2007. During that time, he also served as Minority Leader. Sallah has also served in the Pan-African Parliament, and was the National Alliance for Democracy and Development (NADD)'s candidate for president in the 2006 presidential election, coming third with 6% of the vote.

== Early life ==
Sallah was born and raised in Serekunda, the Gambia, and was educated in the United States, graduating with a degree in sociology. He returned to The Gambia in 1977 and worked as a social worker in the Social Welfare Department.

== Political career ==
=== Jawara era and post-coup ===
After returning from the United States in the late 1970s, Sallah became involved with the People's Movement for Independence against Neo-Colonialism and Capitalism (PMINCC). It is also believed that he was one of the editors of The Voice of the Future newspaper. Along with other PMINCC members, he was arrested in October 1983 and went on trial in 1984 for his involvement in distributing The Voice. He was acquitted but lost his job as a result of the trial.

In 1986, Sallah was one of the founders of the People's Democratic Organisation for Independence and Socialism (PDOIS). He was elected as its secretary-general in August 1987. He also became a major contributor to its newspaper, Foroyaa, which he co-edited with Sidia Jatta. Sallah contested the Serekunda East constituency in the 1987 and 1992 elections for the House of Representatives, but only won around 10% of the vote. Following Yahya Jammeh's coup in 1994, Sallah and other PDOIS leaders adopted a principled stance in response, with Sallah and Jatta both turning down offers to join the Armed Forces Provisional Ruling Council. Both men were detained in August 1994 for publishing an edition of foroyya despite the ban on political activities. They were put on trial, found guilty, and fined, but resumed publication in November 1994 as a non-partisan newspaper.

=== Parliamentary career, arrest and presidential campaign ===
Sallah again unsuccessfully contested the Serekunda East constituency in the 1997 election but was elected to the new constituency of Serekunda Central in the 2002 parliamentary election. As the United Democratic Party (UDP) had boycotted the election, the PDOIS, with two seats, emerged as the largest opposition party, and Sallah became the Minority Leader in the National Assembly. He also served as a member of the Pan-African Parliament in this period. In June 2005, he was expelled from the National Assembly along with three other opposition MPs on the grounds of dual party membership. NADD, an opposition alliance that the PDOIS had joined earlier that year, had been registered as a political party, and the Supreme Court of the Gambia ruled that holding dual membership was against the Gambian Constitution. Some criticised the ruling, claiming that it was a move to silence parliamentary opposition as there was nothing in the Constitution that regulated political parties. On 29 September, a by-election was held in Serrekunda Central, in which Sallah was re-elected by a "huge" margin.

On 15 November 2005, he was arrested along with two other opposition leaders on the grounds of subversion, accused of having collaborated with the President of Senegal. The charges, however, were dropped following the intervention of Olusegun Obasanjo, then-President of Nigeria. Sallah was NADD's candidate in the 2006 presidential election, where he came third and won 5.98% of the vote.

== 2007 Parliament Election ==
He lost his seat in the National Assembly in the 2007 parliamentary election to Sainey Jaiteh, a member of the ruling APRC. While not mentioning Sallah by name, Yahya Jammeh made a coded reference to him and Hamat Bah when he expressed his satisfaction at the defeat of "the two empty barrels in the National Assembly". Sallah blamed the opposition's poor performance in the election on a split in its ranks and said that he intended to retire from politics and concentrate on writing. On 8 March 2009, Sallah was arrested and taken to the central prison, Mile II. The Jammeh regime accused him of spying. However, the charges were dropped against him on 25 March "in the interest of peace and justice". Sallah was also reportedly detained in June 2009, when he went to visit a group of imprisoned journalists at the National Intelligence Agency. He was held overnight before being released on bail. Before the 2011 Gambian presidential election, Sallah released a statement saying he would not be a candidate because "the office of President or Vice President is not of value to [him]".

== 2016 Gambia's Presidential Election ==
In February 2016, it was announced that Sallah would be PDOIS's candidate in the 2016 Gambian presidential election. He later became the spokesperson for Coalition 2016, and following Jammeh's defeat by Adama Barrow in the election, declared that Jammeh would be treated like a "rebel leader" if he did not relinquish control by 19 January 2017, when his term ended. Sallah remained the coalition spokesperson following Barrow's election. It was rumored that Sallah was being considered for Vice-President by Barrow, but Barrow changed his mind following a meeting with Ousainou Darboe and other UDP members. Sallah subsequently declined the offer of a cabinet position. On 17 February 2017, Sallah was appointed as Special Advisor to the President on Governance (but he never take the role). SMBC News commented that his "appointment will bring absolute, total, complete confidence of the Barrow administration."

== 2017 Parliament Election ==
On 24 February 2017, Sallah announced that he would be contesting the 2017 parliamentary election to the National Assembly. Upon submitting his nomination to the Independent Electoral Commission, he said that it would be the duty of the incoming NAMs to build up the National Assembly as an oversight institution. Sallah also resigned from his executive role as an advisor. He stood in the constituency of Serekunda and was duly elected. In August, Sallah called for a debate with Ousainou Darboe, the leader of the United Democratic Party (UDP), over the credibility of Coalition 2016's memorandum of understanding stating that Barrow would only serve for three years, instead of a full five years.

In October 2017, Sallah said that the Barrow government was "reminiscent of the APRC government days" as "nothing seems to have improved the living standard of ordinary Gambians." The Office of the President issued a statement in response stating that "Comparing this government to the former dictatorial regime is a distortion of facts." Sallah visited Ohio University for three days in February 2018. On 8 March, Sallah met with the Cuban Ambassador to The Gambia, Lázaro Herrera, in his home. On 16 March, during a heated exchange over a proposed loan from China, Sallah was removed from the National Assembly on the orders of Speaker Mariam Jack-Denton.

In November 2021, Halifa Sallah's candidacy for the presidential election of 2021-22 is validated by the Independent Electoral Commission (CEI).

== Personal life ==
Sallah was involved in a car accident while touring the country in March 2016 and "suffered cuts to his face", but his injuries were not life-threatening.

Gambia's political scientist, Amat Jeng, writes this about him: "Born in Serrekunda and educated in the US, Halifa Sallah returned home in the 1970s during the turbulent days of pan-Africanism and the Cold War, totally appalled at capitalism, neo-colonialism and the racism he saw in the US. Part of the founding fathers of the ‘Red Star’, commonly known as the People's Movement for Independence against Neo-Colonialism and Capitalism (PMINCC), Sallah began to espouse social democracy, believing that for a nation to realize its political and social freedoms, the masses have to, first, be free from external and internal oppression and domination, and second, be educated to become masters of state and society. For thirty years, Halifa was popular with the educated few, but failed massively to win the support of the masses, because they never understood his politics."
