= 2022 Gambian parliamentary election =

- 9 April 2022
- 53 of the 58 seats in the National Assembly; 29 seats needed for a majority
- Turnout: 51.21% (▲8.43pp)
Party	Leader	Vote %	Seats	+/–
NPP	Adama Barrow	29.19	18	New
UDP	Ousainou Darboe	28.04	15	−16
PDOIS	Sidia Jatta	5.01	2	−2
APRC	Fabakary Jatta	3.19	2	−3
NRP	Samba Jallow	2.87	4	−1
Independents	–	21.76	12	+11
This lists parties that won seats. See the complete results below.
Speaker of the National Assembly before	Speaker of the National Assembly after
Mariam Jack-Denton; UDP	Fabakary Jatta; APRC

Parliamentary elections were held in The Gambia on 9 April 2022 to elect members of the 58-seat National Assembly.

The newly created National People's Party (NPP), led by incumbent President Adama Barrow, emerged victorious, winning 18 seats. The United Democratic Party (UDP) came second, winning 15 seats and becoming the largest opposition party. The National Reconciliation Party (NRP) won four seats, whilst the People's Democratic Organisation for Independence and Socialism (PDOIS) and the Alliance for Patriotic Reorientation and Construction (APRC) won two each. Twelve members elected were independents. As President, Barrow could appoint five additional members, and selected four from the NPP and one from the APRC. Barrow appointed APRC leader Fabakary Jatta as Speaker.

A three-party coalition was subsequently established between the NPP, NRP and APRC, giving the government 29 seats.

== Electoral system ==
The 58 members of the National Assembly consist of 53 members elected from single-member constituencies by first-past-the-post voting and five members appointed by the President, including the Speaker and their deputies.

The Gambia uses a unique system of each voter casting a marble to their preferred candidate's ballot box.

== Conduct ==
ECOWAS deployed 40 election observers to all the 7 administrative regions in the Gambia to monitor the electoral process. H.E. Mohamed Ibn Chambas, head of the ECOWAS observation mission, stated after observing the election process in the capital city of Banjul that the election was "conducted in a calm and transparent atmosphere, using the Gambian electoral process."

== Results ==
Party	Votes	%	Seats	+/–
National People's Party	143,826	29.19	18	New
United Democratic Party	138,176	28.04	15	–16
Gambia Democratic Congress	33,882	6.88	0	–5
People's Democratic Organisation for Independence and Socialism	24,683	5.01	2	–2
Alliance for Patriotic Reorientation and Construction	15,710	3.19	2	–3
National Reconciliation Party	14,153	2.87	4	–1
Citizens' Alliance	8,682	1.76	0	New
Gambia Moral Congress	2,531	0.51	0	0
National Unity Party	1,257	0.26	0	New
People's Progressive Party	1,168	0.24	0	–2
Gambia for All	1,151	0.23	0	New
All Peoples Party	294	0.06	0	New
Independents	107,232	21.76	12	+11
Appointed seats			5	0
Total	492,745	100.00	58	0
Total votes	492,745	–		
Registered voters/turnout	962,157	51.21		
Source: IEC

== See also ==
- List of NAMs elected in the 2022 Gambian parliamentary election
