= Darboe =

Darboe is a Gambian surname. Notable people with the surname include:

- Abdou Darboe (born 1990), Gambian footballer
- Alhagie Darboe, Gambian politician
- Dembo Darboe (born 1998), Gambian footballer
- Ebrima Darboe (born 2001), Gambian footballer
- Ousainou Darboe (born 1948), Gambian human rights lawyer and politician
