= Cecilia Cole =

Gambian politician

Deputy Speaker of the National Assembly of the Gambia
- In office 1997–2000
- Succeeded by: Belinda Bidwell

Personal details
- Party: APRC

Cecilia Cole (née Rendall; 1921 – 2 July 2006) was a Gambian politician who was a Deputy Speaker of the National Assembly.

== Political career ==
She was nominated to the Gambian parliament by President Yahya Jammeh in January 1997 and was the only female member of parliament in that legislature until 2002. She was also Deputy Speaker of Parliament during this period.

== Family ==
Her son-in-law was bishop Solomon Tilewa Johnson.
