= Momodou L. K. Sanneh =

Gambian politician (born 1942)

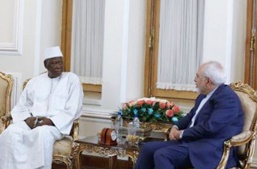

Deputy Speaker of the National Assembly
- In office 11 April 2017 – 17 April 2022
- Preceded by: Fatou Mbye
- Succeeded by: Seedy Njie

National Assembly Minority Leader
- In office 25 January 2007 – 29 March 2012
- Preceded by: Halifa Sallah
- Succeeded by: Samba Jallow

National Assembly Member
- Incumbent
- Assumed office 11 April 2017
- Preceded by: Fatou Mbye
- Constituency: Nominated
- In office 25 January 2007 – 29 March 2012
- Preceded by: Kalifa Kambi
- Succeeded by: Yahya Dibba
- Constituency: Kiang West

Personal details
- Born: 1942 (age 83–84) Batteling, Kiang West, the Gambia
- Party: United Democratic Party

Momodou Lamin K. Sanneh (born 1942) is a Gambian politician who served as Deputy Speaker of the National Assembly from 2017 to 2022. He is a member of the United Democratic Party (UDP) and served as the National Assembly Member (NAM) for Kiang West from 2007 to 2012, as well as the National Assembly Minority Leader in the same time period.

== Education and career ==
Sanneh was born in 1942 in the village of Batteling, in the Kiang West district of the Lower River Region. He attended Dumbuto Lower Basic School from 1949 to 1956 and attended Kiaf Lower Basic School from 1956 to 1959. From 1959 to 1964, he was a student at Crab Island Secondary School. After leaving school, he joined the police force. Between 1972 and 1976, Sanneh worked at the Gambia Utilities Corporation, and then as an office manager at the Nigerian High Commission until 1998.

== Political career ==
During Dawda Jawara's rule, Sanneh twice contested elections against incumbent People's Progressive Party (PPP) politicians. In the 1977 election, he stood as an independent candidate against Amang Kanyi, and in the 1982 election, he stood as a National Convention Party (NCP) candidate against Kawsung Senega Janneh.

His first success came in the 2007 parliamentary election when he stood on the United Democratic Party (UDP) ticket and won the constituency of Kiang West, beating Kalifa Kambi. Between 2007 and 2012, he served as Minority Leader in the National Assembly, and also served on a number of committees, including the National Assembly Authority, the Public Accounts Committee, the Defence and Security Committee, and the Government Project Monitoring Committee. He was also a member of the ECOWAS Parliament between 2007 and 2012.

In 2012, he was awarded Member of the National Order of the Republic of The Gambia (MRG) by President Jammeh. In July 2016, he and 19 other members of the UDP were arrested for taking part in a street protest against Jammeh's regime. They were sentenced on 20 July to three years imprisonment.

Sanneh became a nominated member of the National Assembly in April 2017, following the 2017 parliamentary election. He was appointed as Deputy Speaker, subordinate to Mariam Jack-Denton. In an adjournment debate on 25 April 2017, Sanneh said that the Adama Barrow government should prioritise prison reform, particularly targeting Mile II prison.
