= 1997 Gambian parliamentary election =

- 2 January 1997
- All 49 seats in the National Assembly; 25 seats needed for a majority
- Turnout: 73.21%
Party	Leader	Vote %	Seats	+/–
APRC	Yahya Jammeh	52.13	33	New
UDP	Ousainou Darboe	33.97	7	New
PDOIS	Sidia Jatta	7.88	1	+1
NRP	Hamat Bah	2.16	2	New
Independents	–	3.87	2	−1
This lists parties that won seats. See the complete results below.
Speaker of the National Assembly before	Speaker of the National Assembly after
Position established	Mustapha B. Wadda; APRC

Parliamentary elections were held in the Gambia on 2 January 1997 three months after presidential elections. The first parliamentary elections since Yahya Jammeh's 1994 coup, they were also the first parliamentary elections to be held under the new constitution approved in a 1996 referendum. However, Decree 89 meant that pre-1994 parties (such as the former ruling People's Progressive Party) were still banned. Freedom House characterized the election as "deeply flawed."

The elections were originally scheduled for 11 December 1996, but following an attack on military barracks at Farafenni at the start of November, they were postponed, and all political rallies were banned. Jammeh's Alliance for Patriotic Reorientation and Construction won 33 of the 45 elected seats, enough to change the constitution.

== Results ==
Party	Votes	%	Seats	+/–
Alliance for Patriotic Reorientation and Construction	160,470	52.13	33	New
United Democratic Party	104,568	33.97	7	New
People's Democratic Organisation for Independence and Socialism	24,272	7.88	1	+1
National Reconciliation Party	6,639	2.16	2	New
Independents	11,907	3.87	2	–1
Presidential appointees			4	–4
Total	307,856	100.00	49	–1
Total votes	307,856	–		
Registered voters/turnout	420,507	73.21		
Source: IEC
