= Abdoulie Bojang =

Gambian politician

Speaker of the National Assembly of the Gambia
- In office 12 November 2010 – 6 April 2017
- President: Yahya Jammeh; Adama Barrow
- Deputy: Fatou Mbye
- Preceded by: Fatoumatta Jahumpa Ceesay
- Succeeded by: Mariam Jack-Denton

Deputy Speaker of the National Assembly of the Gambia
- In office 8 February 2007 – 12 November 2010
- Preceded by: Belinda Bidwell
- Succeeded by: Fatou Mbye

Member of the National Assembly of the Gambia
- In office 27 January 2007 – 6 April 2017
- Appointed by: Yahya Jammeh

Personal details
- Born: Sagnajorr, The Gambia
- Died: 29 November 2024
- Party: Alliance for Patriotic Reorientation and Construction
- Spouse: 2
- Children: 7

Abdoulie Bojang (died 29 November 2024) was a Gambian politician who served as Speaker of the National Assembly of the Gambia from 2010 to 2017, and as a member of the assembly for Foni Kansala as a member of the Alliance for Patriotic Reorientation and Construction from 2007 to 2017. He also served as The Gambia's ambassador to South Africa from 2017 to 2020.

== Early life ==
Abdoulie Bojang was born in Sagnajorr, The Gambia, and raised in Brikama.

== Career ==
Before entering politics Bojang was a teacher. In the 2007 election Bojan was nominated to the National Assembly of the Gambia by President Yahya Jammeh for the Foni Kansala constituency. He was a member of the Alliance for Patriotic Reorientation and Construction and was elected Deputy Speaker of the assembly.

Elisabeth Renner was initially nominated to be Speaker of the assembly, but her nomination was revoked by Jammeh. Majority Leader Fabakary Jatta and Minority Leader Momodou L. K. Sanneh nominated Bojang and he was elected with unanimous support. He served as speaker until 2017. After the constitutional crisis he served as the country's ambassador to South Africa until his replacement by Baba Fatajo on 28 January 2020.

In 2023, Bojang stated that The Gambia's sovereignty was at risk due to a lack of border control, immigration, land acquisition by foreigners, and youth unemployment.

== Personal life ==
Bojang was a Muslim. He had two wives, with whom he had seven children. He died on 29 November 2024, after suffering a stroke and a state funeral was held on 2 December.

== Works cited ==
- Darboe, Lamin (15 November 2010). "Abdoulie Bojang is new Speaker". The Point. Archived from the original on 27 June 2025.
- Darboe, Lamin (23 April 2012). "New National Assembly members sworn in". The Point. Archived from the original on 27 June 2025.
- Jaiteh, Binta (28 March 2023). "Abdoulie Bojang says Gambia's security is at risk". Voice Gambia. Archived from the original on 28 March 2023.
- Jawo, Momodou (3 February 2020). "EX- NAWEC boss is new Gambia High Commissioner in South Africa". The Point. Archived from the original on 27 June 2025.
- Jobarteh, Madi (6 June 2017). "Building The New Gambia". The Point. Archived from the original on 27 June 2025.
- Saho, Fatou (3 December 2024). "Assembly bids farewell to late Speaker Abdoulie Bojang". The Standard. Archived from the original on 27 June 2025.
- Saidykhan, Ousman (2 December 2024). "Hundreds gathered to attend the laying-in-state of former Speaker Bojang as mourners paid their final respect". Alkamba Times. Archived from the original on 27 June 2025.
