= Abdoulie Njai =

Gambian politician

Abdoulie Njai is a Gambian politician and member of the National Assembly representing Banjul Central since 2022. He is noted for leading the West African Young Parliamentarians Network. Njai is an advocate for renewable energy and young people in politics.
