= Kebba T. Sanneh =

Gambian politician

Kebba Toumanding Sanneh

Member of the National Assembly of the Gambia for Foni Jarrol
- Incumbent
- Assumed office 20 April 2022
- Preceded by: Alhagie Sankung Jammeh

Personal details
- Party: Independent

Kebba Toumanding Sanneh is a Gambian politician and member of the National Assembly representing Foni Jarrol since 2022. He has spoken out against allegations of political favoritism in decisions regarding appointments to government jobs. He has spoken out against corruption in the government of president Yahya Jammeh.
