= Kumba Jaiteh =

Gambian politician (born 1988/89)

Kumba Jaiteh (born 1988 or 1989) is a Gambian politician. She was a nominated member of the 5th National Assembly of the Gambia, from 2017 to 2022. When nominated, she was the youngest female member to be nominated to the parliament. Whats On Gambia included her in a list of "Top 20 most influential young Gambnians in the New Gambia".

She is a qualified lawyer, having studied at Anglia Ruskin University in England and in The Gambia.

In January 2020, the Supreme Court of the Gambia ruled that president Adama Barrow had acted unlawfully when he had revoked her membership of the national assembly in February 2019 after she had criticised him.
