= Seedy Njie (politician) =

Gambian politician and Deputy Speaker of the National Assembly

Seedy S. K. Njie
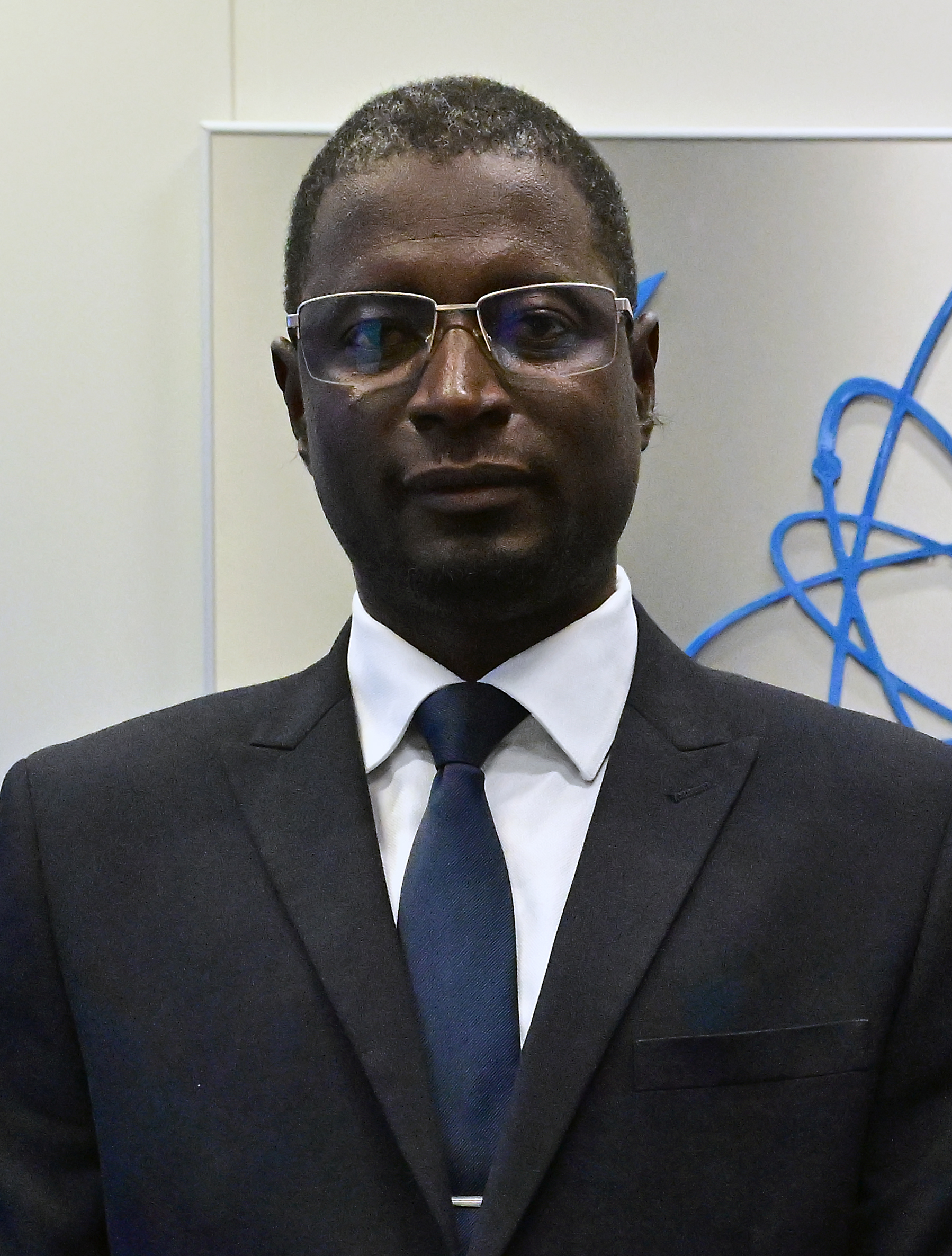
- Seedy SK Njie in 2025

Deputy Speaker of the National Assembly
- Incumbent
- Assumed office April 2022
- President: Adama Barrow

Personal details
- Born: 16 October 1984 (age 41) Chamen, Central River Region, the Gambia
- Party: National People's Party (since 2021); Alliance for Patriotic Reorientation and Construction (2007–2021)

Seedy S. K. Njie (born 16 October 1984) is a Gambian politician who has served as the Deputy Speaker of the National Assembly of the Gambia since 2022. He has held several roles in Gambian politics and has been affiliated with both the Alliance for Patriotic Reorientation and Construction (APRC) and later the National People's Party (NPP).

== Early life and education ==
Njie was born on 16 October 1984 in Chamen village in the Central River Division, and began his political career as a student leader. Njie rose to national prominence as the coordinator and leader of the National Patriotic Students Association (NPSA) established in 2001. The association was closely aligned with then-incumbent president Yahya Jammeh.

== Political career ==
In February 2007, Njie was appointed as a nominated member of the National Assembly by president Jammeh. He served as the APRC's spokesperson and press secretary until 2018. In January 2017, he briefly served as the Minister of Information and Communication Infrastructure following the resignation of Sheriff Bojang Sr. He later went into exile in Equatorial Guinea with Yahya Jammeh. After returning to the Gambia, Njie contested the 2017 parliamentary election in Nianija under the APRC banner but finished fourth out of six candidates, securing only 411 votes.

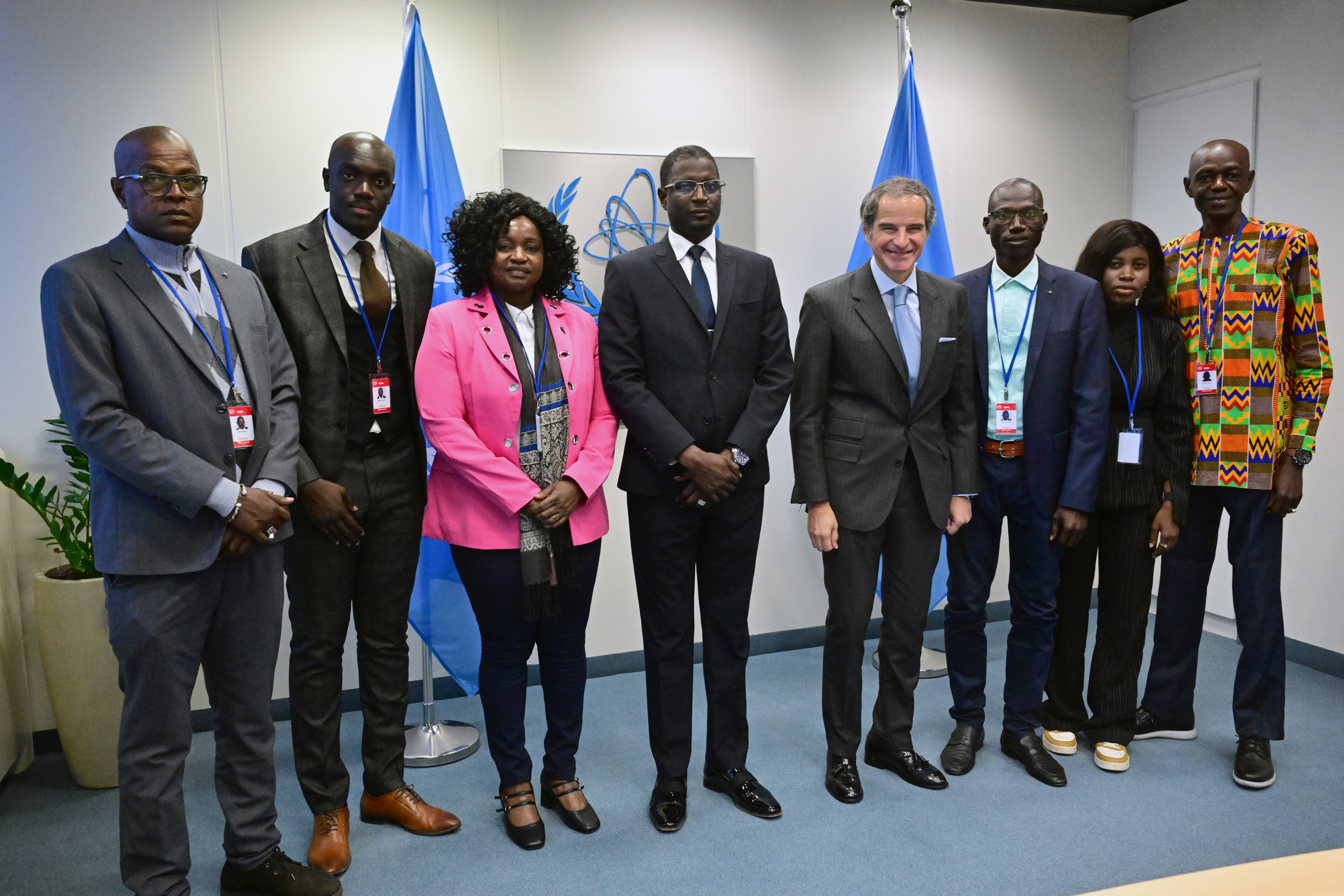
Njie with the Gambian Delegation at the IAEA headquarters in Vienna, Austria. 26 February 2025.

Njie joined the National People's Party (NPP) of president Adama Barrow, and was appointed as the party’s deputy spokesperson in September 2021, a position he still holds. In April 2022, Njie was reappointed as a nominated member of the National Assembly by president Barrow. His reappointment was controversial and was condemned by Nymia Sonko, the widow of Solo Sandeng and by the Centre for Human Rights Violations due to his association with the previous regime of Yahya Jammeh. He was later elected Deputy Speaker of the National Assembly.

== Public image ==
As a politician, Njie is a divisive figure. Supporters view him as a pragmatic leader capable of adapting to political shifts, while critics consider him an opportunist due to his change of allegiance from APRC to NPP.

== Awards and recognitions ==
- Njie received the African Lawmaker of the Year 2022 award from the African Leadership Magazine during the 8th Africa Summit in London. The award acknowledged his contributions to national development and the sustenance of parliamentary democracy.
- He was honored with the Men of Honour Award by Nigeria's GloMay Alliance Company Limited. The award celebrates individuals who have demonstrated exemplary leadership qualities and have made significant contributions in their respective fields.
