= Mustapha B. Wadda =

Gambian politician (1930–2010)

Alhaji Mustapha B. Wadda was a Gambian politician and doctor. He was the Speaker of the National Assembly from 1997 to 2002. He was a member of the Alliance for Patriotic Reorientation and Construction party. He attended medical school at the King's College Hospital Medical School, now called King's College London GKT School of Medical Education. He was married.

Wadda died on 31 January 2010 at the Royal Victoria Teaching Hospital, Banjul, at the age of 79, and buried at the Bakau Cemetery.
