= Bilay G. Tunkara =

Gambian politician

Majority Leader of the National Assembly of the Gambia
- Incumbent
- Assumed office 17 April 2022
- Preceded by: Kebba K. Barrow

Member of the National Assembly of the Gambia for Kantora
- Incumbent
- Assumed office 11 April 2017
- Preceded by: Kebba K. Barrow

Personal details
- Born: September 5, 1988 (age 37) Suduwol, The Gambia
- Party: National People's Party

Bilay G. Tunkara is a Gambian politician and member of the National Assembly representing Kantora since 2017. He has served as Majority Leader of the National Assembly since 2022.

Tunkara has led Gambian participation in ECOWAS, being elected deputy speaker. In 2025, his request for an inquiry into former president Yahya Jammeh's assets garnered controversy, as critics dubbed it as a "coverup" and "too vague".
