= Suduwol =

Gambian settlement

Coordinates: 13°22′9.43″N 13°58′18.28″W

Suduwol is a village in Upper River Division, Gambia. It is a Soninke-speaking village with a population of approximately 3780 {this is 2008 census}. The village is made of seven tributes (Tunkara, Jaguraga, Sillah, Nimaga, Trawally, Sinera, Camara and Kanteh, and minority tribes including sawaneh and samura kunda, Kaira kunda, Danjo, Drammeh, and fofana). The village is ruled by the Tunkaras’ tribe and they holds key positions such as Head of the village locally called (Degumee) and Imam.

The current head of the city is Alhagie Maju Tunkara (Nov-2018). The Tunkaras in Gambia are a mix of Soninke and Mandinka people. They live throughout West Africa and many immigrated to Europe.

Suduwol is home to a primary and a secondary school. Recently a high school has been established.The village also has Islamic school known as Madrasa.

The Soninke, also called Saraculeh or Serahuli, are a Mande people who descend from the Bafour and closely related to the Imraguen of Mauritania. They speak Soninke, a mande language. They were the founders of the ancient empire of Ghana, 750-1240 CE. Subgroups of Soninke include the Maraka and Wangara. After contact with Muslim Almoravid traders from the north around 1066, Soninke nobles of neighboring Takrur were among the first ethnic groups from Africa to embrace Islam. When the Ghana empire dispersed, the resulting diaspora brought Soninkes to Mali, Senegal, Mauritania, Gambia and Guinea-Bissau. This diaspora included Wangara, famous traders who spread far from traditionally Mande areas. Hence the term Wangara is used today in Ghana and Burkina Faso to describe the Soninke populations in cities and towns.

== Diet ==
The Suduwol consumer a variety of foods. Breakfast foods include “Honde”, porridge made of millet, sugar, milk and salt and “Sombi” porridge made of rice, millet or corn. For lunch “Demmu Teray” and “Takhahay” are very common, both containing rice and peanuts, common Soninke ingredients. "Deray”, a stew, is a mixture of millet and beans.

== Economy ==
The primary occupations are trade and agriculture. During the rainy season, men and women both cultivate. However women usually stay at home to cook and take care of children. They also work dyeing cotton material. A typical Soninke colour is Indigo. The Suduwol attained a high standard of living.
