= Bintanding Jarju =

Gambian politician

Bintanding Jarju (born 10 April 1957) is a former member of the Pan-African Parliament of the African Union from the Gambia. She is the former member of the National Assembly for Foni Brefet.

In the 2002, parliamentary elections, Jarju stood as a candidate for the Alliance for Patriotic Reorientation and Construction (APRC) in the Foni Berefet constituency and won the constituency due to a lack of opposing candidates.

In the following elections in 2007, Jawla remained unopposed and continued to represent the constituency in parliament. From 2004, she was simultaneously nominated as a member (2004-2009 and 2009-2014) of the Pan-African Parliament of the African Union. There she served on the Committee on Gender Issues.
