= Alhagie S. Darboe =

Gambian politician

Minority Leader of the National Assembly of the Gambia
- Incumbent
- Assumed office 20 April 2022
- Preceded by: Samba Jallow

Member of the National Assembly of the Gambia for Brikama North
- Incumbent
- Assumed office 11 April 2017
- Preceded by: Constituency established

Personal details
- Party: United Democratic Party
- Education: The Gambia College, University of the Gambia

Alhagie S. Darboe is a Gambian politician and member of the National Assembly representing Brikama North since 2017. He is the current Minority Leader in the Assembly. He is noted for his dialogue with President Adama Barrow. Darboe is an advocate for renewable energy and cooperation with ECOWAS to invest in solar energy to provide more reliable electricity across the country. Before entering politics, Darboe worked as a teacher at Bottrop Senior Secondary School in Brikama.
