= 2007 Gambian parliamentary election =

- 25 January 2007

48 of the 53 seats of the National Assembly 27 seats needed for a majority
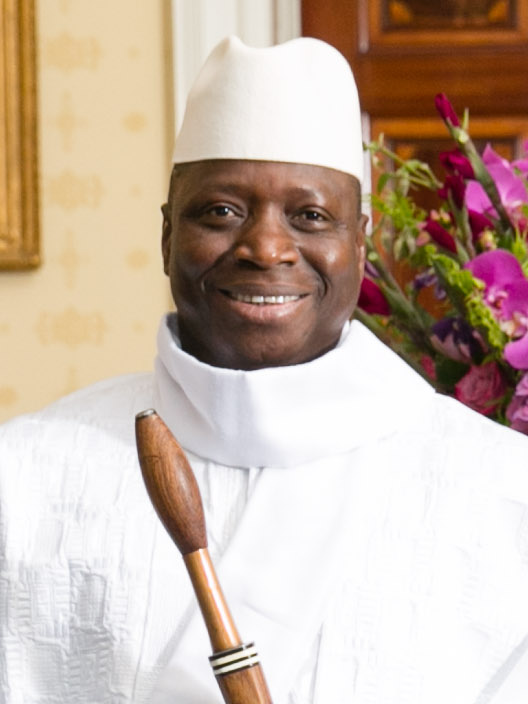

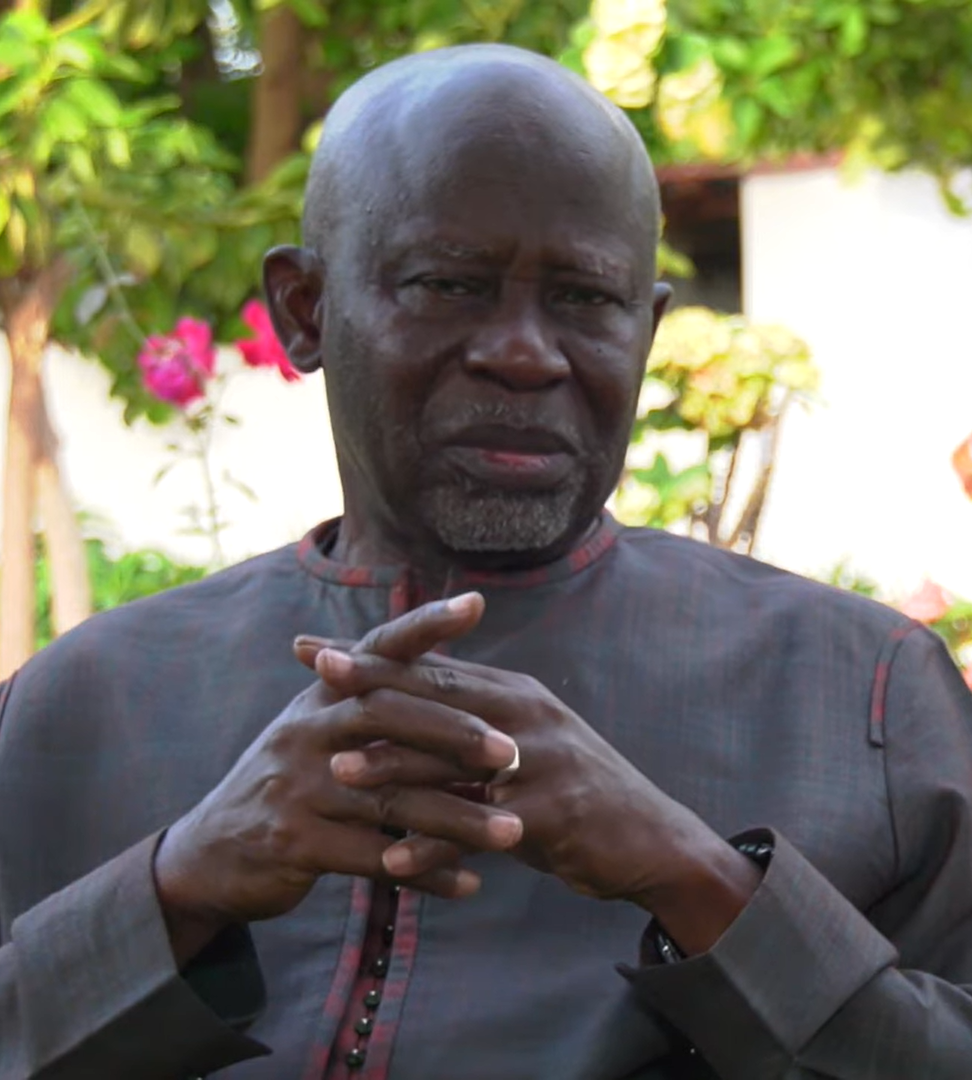
	First party	Second party
Leader	Yahya Jammeh	Ousainou Darboe
Party	APRC	UDP
Seats before	45	New
Seats won	42	4
Seat change	▼3	New
Popular vote	156,573	57,368
Percentage	59.77%	21.90%
President before election
Yahya Jammeh
APRC
Elected President
Yahya Jammeh
APRC

Parliamentary elections were held in the Gambia on 25 January 2007. Forty-eight members of the National Assembly were elected, with another five being appointed by the President. The result was a victory for the ruling Alliance for Patriotic Reorientation and Construction (APRC), which won 42 of the 48 seats.

After the elections, President Yahya Jammeh said that "constituencies that voted the opposition should not expect my government's development projects. I want to teach people that opposition in Africa does not pay." He expressed satisfaction with the results and said that "voters have thrown out the two empty barrels from the National Assembly"; this was believed to be a reference to the defeat of two prominent opposition politicians, Halifa Sallah and Hamat Bah. Salleh blamed the opposition's poor performance on a split in its ranks and said that he intended to retire from politics.

== Campaign ==
A total of 103 candidates were approved by the Independent Electoral Commission. The ruling APRC was the only party to contest all 48 seats, and ran unopposed in five constituencies.

== Electoral system ==
Forty-eight single member districts were elected using first-past-the-post.

== Results ==
Party	Votes	%	Seats	+/–
Alliance for Patriotic Reorientation and Construction	156,573	59.77	42	–3
United Democratic Party	57,368	21.90	4	New
National Reconciliation Party	14,932	5.70	0	–1
National Alliance for Democracy and Development	13,990	5.34	1	–1
Independents	19,111	7.29	1	+1
Appointed members			5	0
Total	261,974	100.00	53	+4
Valid votes	261,974	99.98		
Invalid/blank votes	41	0.02		
Total votes	262,015	100.00		
Registered voters/turnout	628,160	41.71		
Source: IEC
