= Fabakary Jatta =

Speaker of the National Assembly of the Gambia, 2022-

Speaker of the National Assembly
- Incumbent
- Assumed office 17 April 2022
- President: Adama Barrow
- Deputy: Seedy Njie
- Preceded by: Mariam Jack-Denton

Leader of the Alliance for Patriotic Reorientation and Construction
- Incumbent
- Assumed office 21 January 2017
- Preceded by: Yahya Jammeh

National Assembly Majority Leader
- In office 27 January 2007 – 6 April 2017
- Preceded by: Churchill Baldeh
- Succeeded by: Kebba K. Barrow

Member of the National Assembly
- Incumbent
- Assumed office 17 April 2022
- Constituency: Appointed
- In office 2 January 1997 – 6 April 2017
- Constituency: Serekunda East

Personal details
- Born: 16 November 1952 (age 73) Albreda, Gambia Colony and Protectorate
- Party: Alliance for Patriotic Reorientation and Construction
- Nickname: FTJ

Fabakary Tombong Jatta (born 16 November 1952) is a Gambian politician who has served as Speaker of the National Assembly since 2022 and the leader of the Alliance for Patriotic Reorientation and Construction (APRC) since 2017. He previously served as Majority Leader of the National Assembly from 2007 to 2017.

== Early life and career ==
Jatta was born on 16 November 1952 in Albreda, Gambia. He was educated at Armitage High School and Yundum College (1970–1973). He later worked as a teacher in Bansang from 1973 to 1977 and at Crab Island Junior Secondary School, Banjul from 1977 to 1979 before joining Nigeria Airways, where he became the district accountant.

== Political career ==
During the era of the Gambian First Republic (1970–1974), Jatta supported the National Convention Party and was taken to court for allegedly registering to vote in two different constituencies. He joined the APRC following its establishment in 1996. Jatta was elected as the National Assembly Member (NAM) for Serekunda East in the 1997 parliamentary election and was re-elected in 2002, 2007 and 2012. In 2004, he was appointed as one of the Gambian members of the Pan-African Parliament. He was chosen as the National Assembly Majority Leader by president Yahya Jammeh following the 2007 election.

In 2010, Jatta was the principal nominator of Abdoulie Bojang for the position of Speaker. In February 2016, it was announced that Jatta was one of four Gambian parliamentarians also appointed to the Economic Community of West African States (ECOWAS) Parliament.

Jatta retired as a NAM at the 2017 parliamentary election but became the new APRC party leader after the self-exile of former leader Yahya Jammeh. He raised some questions over the conduct of the 2017 election, pointing to irregularities in the conduct of the election and suggesting that some APRC supporters were harassed. Jatta argued that the APRC should not be blamed for the actions of Jammeh, claiming "you cannot do collective punishment for people. We believe that the Gambia should move forward."

On 17 April 2022, Jatta was appointed by president Adama Barrow as Speaker of the National Assembly following the 2022 parliamentary elections.
