= People's Democratic Organisation for Independence and Socialism =

Political party in the Gambia

- Leader: Halifa Sallah
- Founder: Sidia Jatta
- Founded: 31 July 1986
- Headquarters: Serekunda
- Newspaper: Foroyaa
- Ideology: Democratic socialism
- Political position: Left-wing
- Colours: Brown
- Slogan: "Liberty, Dignity and Prosperity"
- National Assembly: 2 / 58

Website
- www.pdois.org

The People's Democratic Organisation for Independence and Socialism (PDOIS) is a left-wing and democratic socialist political party in the Gambia. Since 2005, it has been part of the National Alliance for Democracy and Development (NADD). It was part of Coalition 2016 in the 2016 presidential election, whose candidate, Adama Barrow, defeated long-time incumbent Yahya Jammeh. The PDOIS also publishes a party newspaper, Foroyaa, which was noted for its opposition to the Jammeh regime.

== History ==
The party was founded on 31 July 1986. It emerged from an earlier group, the People's Movement for Independence against Neo-Colonialism and Capitalism in The Gambia (PMINCC), whose members included Halifa Sallah, Sam Sarr, Amie Sillah, Adama Bah and Momodou Sarho. The PMINCC were also believed to be the publishers of the newspaper The Voice of the Future, and six members were put on trial for its publication in 1984, although all were acquitted.

Initially, the PDOIS had no official leader until December 1997, when Sidia Jatta was chosen as its first leader. It began publishing its own newspaper, Foroyaa, in July 1987, where it was critical of the pro-Western foreign policy of Dawda Jawara, and opposed the Senegambia Confederation. In 1987, it put forward five candidates in the parliamentary election, but all were defeated. In 1992, it put forward 14 candidates, but again, all were defeated. Jatta stood in the presidential election that year, and came fourth, winning 5.24% of the vote. The PDOIS along with other political parties was banned following the 1994 coup by Yahya Jammeh and both Jatta and Sallah turned down the cabinet posts they were offered. The party had to reregister with the Provisional Independent Electoral Commission in 1996 following the lifting of the ban on political parties.

Jatta won 3% of the vote in the 1996 and 2001 presidential elections. In the 1997 parliamentary election, Jatta won their first seat in the National Assembly of Wuli West. In 2002, Jatta retained the seat and Sallah additionally won the seat of Serekunda Central. From 2002 to 2007, PDOIS was the largest opposition party in the National Assembly, and Sallah served as Leader of the Opposition. In 2005, the PDOIS joined the National Alliance for Democracy and Development (NADD), and Sallah was selected as the NADD candidate in the 2006 presidential election, but only won 6% of the vote. In the 2007 parliamentary election, NADD only won one seat, Jatta's, with Sallah losing his.

== Leadership ==
The party is led by a Central Committee, which is the highest working body of the party. It is composed of the following positions:

- Chairperson – Sidia Jatta
- Vice Chairperson
- Secretary General – Halifa Sallah
- Secretary to the Political Bureau
- Secretary to the Information Bureau – Sam Sarr
- Secretary to the Organizing Bureau
- Secretary to the Bureau on Women and Child Affairs – Amie Sillah
- Secretary to the Youth Bureau
- Treasurer
- Auditor
- Other members as the party Congress determines

== Electoral history ==
=== Presidential elections ===
Election	Party candidate	Votes	%	Result
1992	Sidia Jatta	10,543	5.24%	Lost ✗
1996	Sidia Jatta	11,337	2.87%	Lost ✗
2001	Sidia Jatta	13,841	3.02%	Lost ✗
2006	Halifa Sallah	23,473	5.98%	Lost ✗
2011 (Note: Supported NRP candidate.)	Hamat Bah	73,060	11.11%	Lost ✗
2016 (Note: Supported Adama Barrow as independent candidate for Coalition 2016.)	Adama Barrow	227,708	43.29%	Won ✓
2021	Halifa Sallah	32,435	3.77%	Lost ✗

=== National Assembly elections ===
Election	Leader	Votes	%	Seats	+/–	Position	Government
1987	Sidia Jatta	2,069	0.98%	0 / 53	New	▲5th	Extra-parliamentary
1992	Sidia Jatta	4,632	2.31%	0 / 53	0	5th	Extra-parliamentary
1997	Sidia Jatta	24,272	7.88%	1 / 49	▲1	▲4th	Opposition
2002	Sidia Jatta			2 / 53	▲1	▲3rd	Opposition
2007 (Note: Run within National Alliance for Democracy and Development.)	Sidia Jatta	13,990	5.31%	1 / 53	▼1	3rd	Opposition
2012	Sidia Jatta	Election boycotted		0 / 53	▼1		Extra-parliamentary
2017	Sidia Jatta	33,894	8.94%	4 / 58	▲4	▲5th	Opposition
2022	Sidia Jatta	24,683	5.01%	2 / 58	▼2	▲4th	Opposition
