= Mariam Jack-Denton =

Gambian lawyer and politician (born 1955)

Speaker of the National Assembly
- In office 11 April 2017 – 17 April 2022
- President: Adama Barrow
- Deputy: Momodou L. K. Sanneh
- Preceded by: Abdoulie Bojang
- Succeeded by: Fabakary Jatta

Member of the National Assembly
- Incumbent
- Assumed office 11 April 2017

Personal details
- Born: 29 December 1955 (age 70)
- Party: United Democratic Party

Mariam Jack-Denton (born 29 December 1955), also known as Ajaratou Mariam Denton, is a Gambian lawyer and politician who served as Speaker of the National Assembly of the Gambia from April 2017 to April 2022.

== Early life and legal career ==
Jack-Denton was born in 1955, the daughter of Sir Alieu Sulayman Jack, who was a Gambian politician and the Speaker of the House of Representatives from 1962 to 1972. Her brother, Sulayman Bun Jack, was a permanent secretary at the Department of Defence in Sir Dawda Jawara's government and is currently a British citizen.

Jack-Denton trained as a barrister and became the first female Gambian to be called to the bar in the early 1980s. She worked as a state counsel and senior state counsel before becoming a legal advisor to the Governor of the Central Bank of The Gambia. She lost her job following the 1994 coup d'état and began an independent practice.

Her barrister's chambers are based at Serign Modou Sillah Street, Banjul. She also worked as a legal advisor to the United Democratic Party, the main opposition party during the Yahya Jammeh government. She was arrested in March 2006 and detained for three months following an attempted coup plot by a group of soldiers and civilians. However, she was later granted bail by the High Court of the Gambia in the 2006 court case Denton v The Director-General, National Intelligence Agency and Others. The government's case against her was dropped.

== Political career ==
Jack-Denton was nominated as one of five nominated members of the National Assembly by President Adama Barrow on 11 April 2017. Later that day, she was confirmed as the Speaker of the National Assembly and sworn in by the Chief Justice, Hassan Bubacar Jallow. Following her appointment, Musa Saidykhan commented in Kairo News that "a solid background in law coupled with the spirit of a fighter, [means] many Gambians think Mariam Denton deserves to be a Speaker in a free and democratic Gambia."

On 17 April 2022, she stepped down as Fabakary Jatta became the Speaker of the National Assembly.

== Personal life ==
She is the widow of the former Accountant-General, Abou Denton.

== See also ==
- First women lawyers around the world
