= Ousainou Darboe =

Gambian politician and lawyer

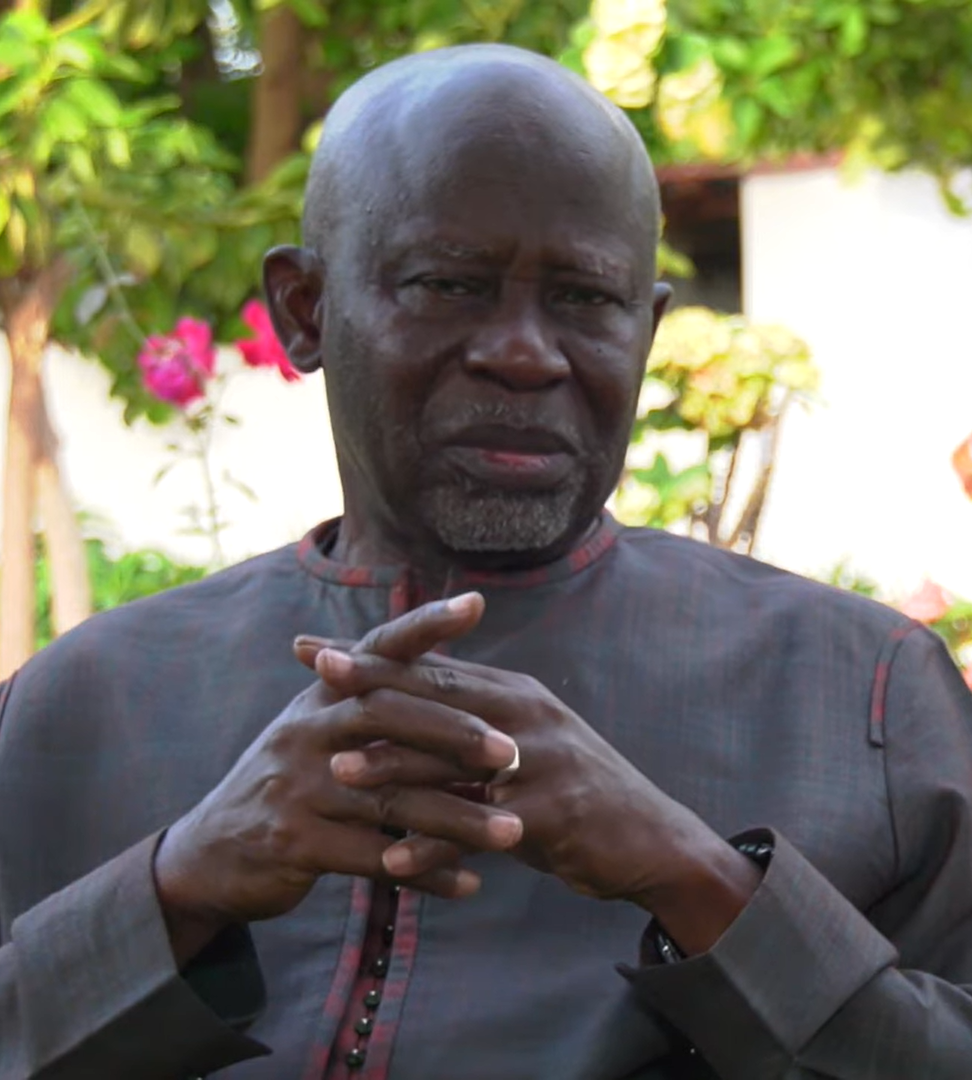
- Darboe in 2019

9th Vice-President of the Gambia
- In office 29 June 2018 – 15 March 2019
- President: Adama Barrow
- Preceded by: Fatoumata Tambajang
- Succeeded by: Isatou Touray

Minister of Women's Affairs
- In office 29 June 2018 – 15 March 2019
- President: Adama Barrow
- Preceded by: Fatoumata Tambajang

Minister of Foreign Affairs
- In office 1 February 2017 – 29 June 2018
- President: Adama Barrow
- Preceded by: Neneh MacDouall-Gaye
- Succeeded by: Mamadou Tangara

Leader of the United Democratic Party
- Incumbent
- Assumed office August 1996

Personal details
- Born: 8 August 1948 (age 78) Gambia Protectorate
- Party: United Democratic Party
- Relations: Muhammed Kanteh (Nephew)
- Education: University of Lagos; University of Ottawa

Ousainou Darboe (born 8 August 1948) is a Gambian politician and leader of the main opposition United Democratic Party (UDP). He previously served as Vice-President of the Gambia and Minister of Women's Affairs from June 2018 to March 2019, under President Adama Barrow. He also served as President Barrow's Minister of Foreign Affairs from February 2017 to June 2018.

Darboe is a human rights lawyer, and worked for the Attorney General's Chambers before entering private practice. He has served as advisor to several companies and government agencies, and was also for a time the vice president of the Gambia Bar Association. He founded the United Democratic Party (UDP) in 1996 and stood in presidential elections the same year, and has been a presidential candidate in 2001, 2006, and 2021. He was imprisoned in 2016, but released after Barrow's victory.

Darboe is running in the 2026 Gambian presidential election.

== Early life and education ==
Darboe was born in 1948, in Dobbo, the son of Numukunda Darboe, who served as a member of parliament for Lower Falluda West, and as communications secretary for Pierre Sarr N'Jie's United Party. Darboe attended Bansang Primary School and then proceeded to Banjul, where he studied at Saint Augustine High School and Gambia High School. Darboe was the recipient of a Commonwealth scholarship to study law at the University of Lagos in Nigeria. He also later studied a master's degree in law from the University of Ottawa, Canada. He is the first Gambian lawyer from the Mandinka ethnic group.

== Legal career ==
Darboe was called to the Federal Bar of Nigeria in 1973 and returned to the Gambia in May 1973 to take up a role as a state prosecutor. He was called to the Gambian bar in November 1973, becoming the first Gambian lawyer from the Mandinka ethnic group. He then worked at the Attorney General's Chambers, firstly as a state counsel, then as acting registrar-general, and then as a legal draftsman, before resigning in 1980 in protests against the government's use of draconian legislation to suppress opposition.

Darboe then entered a private practice, working as a human rights barrister. He founded Basansang Chambers in 1980. He was later joined as a senior partner by Neneh M.C. Cham and Lamin Darboe. Darboe is credited with having saved the lives of over 200 Gambians from the death penalty. Following the failed 1981 coup against Dawda Jawara's government, Darboe successfully defended many involved, including Pap Cheyassin Secka and Sheriff Mustapha Dibba who were both tried for treason. Darboe also represented the majority of those detained under 'Emergency Powers' following the coup.

He has worked as a legal advisor to many major Gambian companies and organisations, including Gamtel, Continent Bank (which dissolved in 2003), Gambia Public Transport Corporation, and the Social Security and Housing Finance Corporation. He also continued to provide advice and representation on a pro bono basis. He served the Gambia Bar Association for several years as its vice president and was also a member of the National Advisory Committee on the selection of judges to the International Court of Justice.

== Political career ==
=== Major opposition politician ===
1994 in the Gambia saw a military coup, propelling Yahya Jammeh into the role of head of state. In August 1996, Darboe founded the United Democratic Party based on "democracy, constitutionalism and the rule of law", and became its first leader. He first ran for president in the 1996 presidential election, where he came second to Jammeh, winning 35.84% of the vote to Jammeh's 55.77%. However, the election was widely criticised by observers for its flaws.

In June 2000, while on the campaign trail for the 2001 election, his convoy was ambushed by supporters of the Jammeh regime. One attacker, Alieu Njie, was killed in the process. Darboe and 20 others were arrested and held in Basse police station before being transferred to the high court in Banjul and being granted bail.

He ran again in the 2001 election, representing a three-way coalition of the UDP, the People's Progressive Party (PPP), and the Gambian People's Party (GPP). He again finished second behind Jammeh, winning 32.59% of the vote. In 2005, the UDP joined with four other opposition parties to form the National Alliance for Democracy and Development (NADD), in preparation for elections in late 2006 and early 2007. The alliance, however, disintegrated after the UDP and the National Reconciliation Party (NRP) withdrew in early 2006.

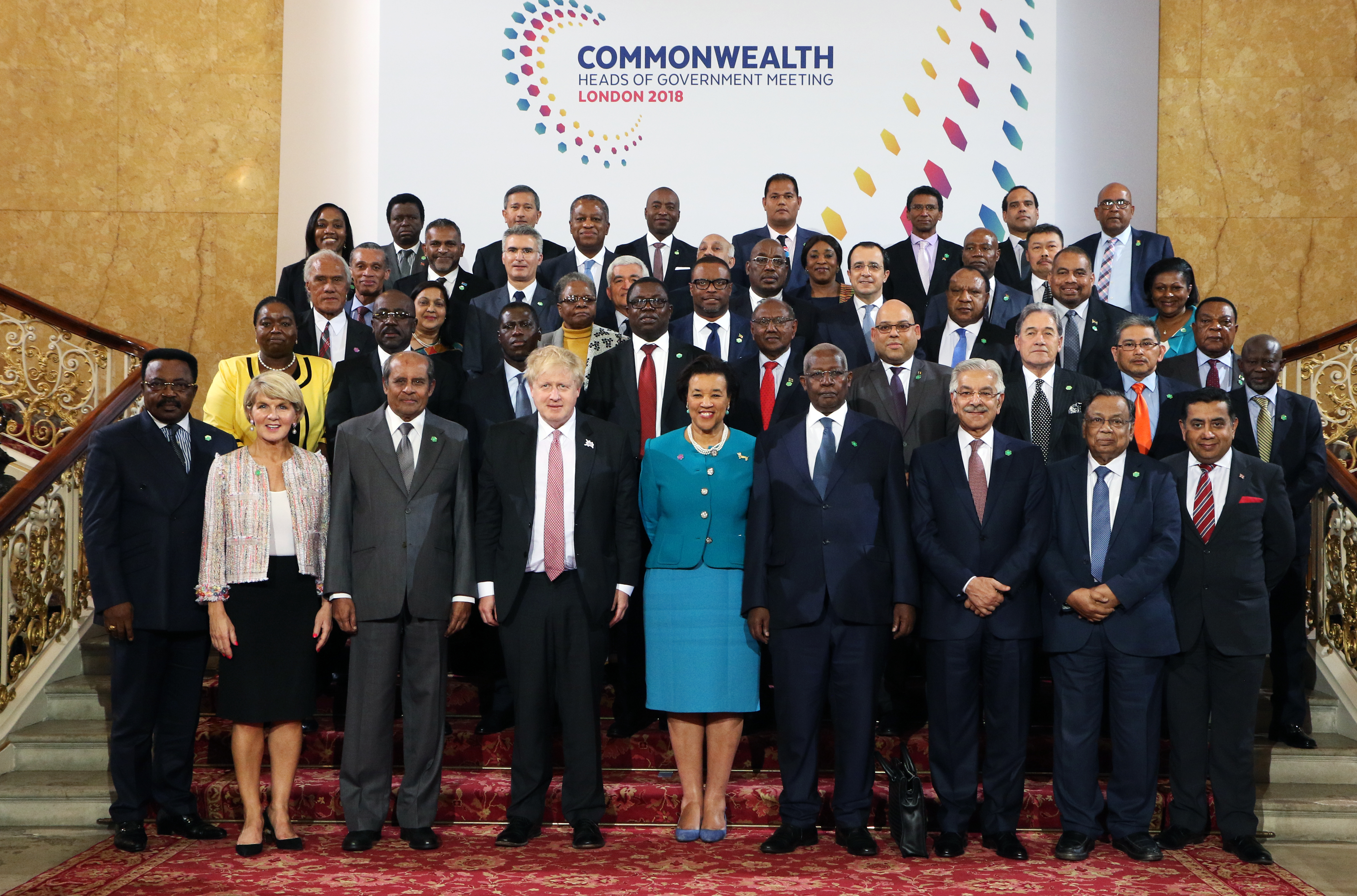
Darboe (second row, far right) at a meeting of Commonwealth foreign ministers in 2018.

By the time the presidential election was held in September 2006, Darboe's UDP had formed another coalition with the NRP and the Gambia Party for Democracy and Progress (GPDP) called the 'Alliance for Regime Change'. In the election, Darboe's running mate was Hamat Bah. Jammeh won the election with 67.33% of the vote followed by Darboe, who won 26.69%. A third candidate representing the remaining NADD parties, Halifa Sallah, finished a distant third with 5.98% of the vote. Darboe rejected the official results of the election, saying that the election was not free and fair and that there was widespread voter intimidation. Despite facing arrests and political challenges, Darboe remained committed to his principles.

Darboe was arrested in April 2016 for participating in protests demanding the body (dead or alive) of his party's Youth Leader, Ebrima Solo Sandeng, who was arrested by the state security agents, tortured and eventually died in custody, a day after his arrest. Darboe remained in jail, during the period leading up to the December 2016 presidential election, and in his absence, Adama Barrow, a businessman without political experience, was designated as the party's presidential candidate(with Darboe's endorsement). In a shock result, Barrow, as the joint opposition candidate leading Coalition 2016, defeated Jammeh in the election. A few days after the election, Darboe was among 19 members of the opposition released from prison. After joining the government, he strongly advocated for President Adama Barrow to be in charge for five(5) years, which violated the Coalition agreement of three(3) but later reversed his decision after being sacked from the government by President Adama Barrow.

=== Minister of Foreign Affairs ===
On 1 February 2017, Darboe was sworn in as Barrow's Minister of Foreign Affairs. The next day, he met with foreign diplomats accredited to the Gambia in order to "strengthen bilateral relations between the Gambia and the world". The same week as his swearing-in, it was confirmed that €33 million in foreign aid from the European Union that had been frozen under Jammeh's regime would be released to the Gambia.

In late 2017, Darboe courted controversy when he demanded that the president of Togo, Faure Gnassingbé, resign due to massive anti-government protests. He withdrew the statement a few days later.

=== Vice president ===
In a cabinet reshuffle in June 2018, Darboe was promoted to the position of vice president and minister of presidential affairs, replacing Fatoumata Tambajang, who had held the position since November 2017. Darboe's tenure as vice president was fraught with reports of constant disagreement with President Adama Barrow. This would ultimately lead to his removal as vice president in a cabinet reshuffle of 15 March 2019, which also saw the removal of Amadou Sanneh and Lamin N. Dibba, both ministers belonging to the UDP. Darboe ran as the UDP's candidate in the 2021 presidential election, but incumbent Adam Barrow won with almost 28% of the vote.

=== Minority leader ===
Following the 2022 elections, his party became the largest opposition in the National Assembly and he became the National Assembly Minority Leader. Ousainou Darboe did not take up the role of National Assembly Minority Leader himself. Rather, UDP member Alagie S. Darboe was chosen to serve as the Minority Leader.

== Personal life ==
Darboe is married with two wives and several children. His eldest daughter, Mariama, is a graduate of Tulane University in the United States. He is a sports enthusiast and served as vice president of the Gambian National Olympic and Sports Committee for several years, as well as chairman of the Gambia Wrestling Federation.

== See also ==
- List of foreign ministers in 2017
- List of current foreign ministers

Political offices
Preceded by Neneh Macdoouall Gaye	Foreign Minister of the Gambia; 1 February 2017 – 29 June 2018	Succeeded by Mamadou Tangara
