= Samba Jallow =

Gambian politician

National Assembly Minority Leader
- In office 19 April 2012 – 17 April 2022
- Preceded by: Momodou L. K. Sanneh
- Succeeded by: Ousainou Darboe

National Assembly Member for Niamina Dankunku
- Incumbent
- Assumed office 29 March 2012

Personal details
- Party: National Reconciliation Party

Samba Jallow is a Gambian politician who has served in the National Assembly representing Niamina Dankunku since 2012. A member of the National Reconciliation Party, Jallow also served as Minority Leader in the National Assembly from 2012 to 2022.

== Political career ==
Jallow is a member of the National Reconciliation Party. In the 2007 parliamentary election to the National Assembly of the Gambia, he contested the Niamina Dankuku constituency, winning 946 votes to Essa Saidykhan, the APRC's candidate's 1047 votes. In the 2012 parliamentary election, however, Jallow was elected as the member for Niamina Dankuku. He was also appointed as Minority Leader in the National Assembly.

In July, he said that the government is deliberately trying to dismantle the Gambia Radio & Television Service. He said, "definitely, it is the government that is making the institution to die." In a debate over the coming year's budget in December 2015, Jallow expressed his concerns over the Gambia's "ill economy". In particular, he expressed concerns over the country's rising national debt and trade deficit. He noted that the government "will also have to engage in agricultural diversification" and that it ought to repair its relations with the European Union to regain access to its foreign aid. He concluded that the Gambia will "continue to face problems if we do not do some of these adjustments."

He criticised Jammeh's government on a number of issues throughout 2016. In July, he urged the National Assembly to table a motion of no confidence in Jammeh, under Section, "which deals with mental or physical incapacity of the President." In August, he challenged prematurely calling the Gambia an Islamic State as it was contrary to a specific clause in the constitution. In October, he condemned the unilateral removal of the Gambia from membership of the International Criminal Court.

On 1 December 2016, incumbent Yahya Jammeh lost the 2016 Gambian presidential election to coalition candidate Adama Barrow. Following the surprise acceptance of the results by Jammeh, Jallow said, "I will take this opportunity to thank the outgoing President, considering what would have happened if he refused to concede to defeat, this country would have been in chaos." However, Jammeh later rescinded this and refused to relinquish control. Speaking in the National Assembly on 29 December 2016, he said that it would be better to resolve the crisis as a family rather than waiting for outside military intervention. He later explained that National Assembly members opted to extend Jammeh's term by declaring a state of emergency due to the threat that they would lose their gratuity.
