= National Reconciliation Party =

Political party in the Gambia

- Leader: Hamat Bah
- Founded: 1996
- Ideology: Social conservatism Social liberalism Secularism
- Political position: Centre-right
- National Assembly: 4 / 58

The National Reconciliation Party is a political party in The Gambia. It was founded in 1996 and is led by its founder Hamat Bah.

Previously an opposition party, it has now been part of a coalition government headed by President Adama Barrow since 2017.

== History ==
The National Reconciliation Party was founded in 1996 by Hamat Bah as part of his intention to run for the presidency. He ultimately finished third in the presidential election, which was won by Yahya Jammeh. The party remained in opposition to him for the next twenty years.

The NRP was part of Coalition 2016, which fielded activist Adama Barrow as their candidate and successfully denied Jammeh a fifth term in that year's presidential election. The party has since been a key member of Barrow's government, with Bah serving as Minister of Tourism and Culture.

== Notable members ==
- Hamat Bah, Leader of the NRP (1996–present), NAM (1997–2005), Minister of Tourism and Culture (2017–present)
- Modou Bamba Gaye, NAM (2015–2017)
- Samba Jallow, NAM (2012–present), National Assembly Minority Leader (2012–present)

== Electoral history ==
=== Presidential elections ===
| Election | Candidate | Votes | % | Result |
|---|---|---|---|---|
| 1996 | Hamat Bah | 21,759 | 5.52% | Lost ✗ |
| 2001 | Hamat Bah | 35,671 | 7.78% | Lost ✗ |
| 2006 (Note: Supported PDOIS candidate.) | Halifa Sallah | 23,473 | 5.98% | Lost ✗ |
| 2011 | Hamat Bah | 73,060 | 11.11% | Lost ✗ |
| 2016 (Note: Supported Adama Barrow as independent candidate for Coalition 2016.) | Adama Barrow | 227,708 | 43.29% | Won ✓ |

=== National Assembly elections ===
| Election | Leader | Votes | % | Seats | +/– | Position | Government |
|---|---|---|---|---|---|---|---|
| 1997 | Hamat Bah | 6,639 | 2.16% | 2 / 49 | New | ▲4th | Opposition |
| 2002 | Hamat Bah | 11,914 | 20.90% | 1 / 53 | ▼1 | ▲3rd | Opposition |
| 2007 | Hamat Bah | 15,783 | 5.99% | 0 / 53 | ▼1 | ▼4th | Extra-parliamentary |
| 2012 | Hamat Bah | 14,606 | 9.43% | 1 / 53 | ▲1 | ▲2nd | Opposition |
| 2017 | Hamat Bah | 23,755 | 6.26% | 5 / 53 | ▲4 | ▼4th | Coalition (UDP-NRP-PPP) |
| 2022 | Hamat Bah | 14,153 | 2.87% | 4 / 53 | ▼1 | ▼6th | Coalition (NPP-NRP-APRC) |
