= List of speakers of the National Assembly of the Gambia =

Speaker of the National Assembly of the Gambia
- Coat of Arms
- Incumbent; Fabakary Jatta since 17 April 2022
- Inaugural holder: John A. Mahoney
- Formation: 1954

The speaker of the National Assembly of the Gambia is the presiding officer over proceedings in the National Assembly. In the official hierarchy, the speaker is the third-highest ranking office in the Gambia following the president and vice president.

== List of speakers ==
=== Legislative Council of the Gambia ===
Name	Took office	Left office	Ref.
Sir John A. Mahoney	1954	1962	

=== House of Representatives of the Gambia ===
Name	Took office	Left office	Party	Ref.
Sir Alieu Sulayman Jack	1962	1972	PPP	
Dr. S.H.O. Jones	1972	1983	PPP	
Alhaji Momodou Baboucar Njie (BP)	1983	1994	PPP	

=== National Assembly of the Gambia ===
Name	Took office	Left office	Party	Ref.
Mustapha B. Wadda	1997	2001	APRC	
Sheriff Mustapha Dibba	2002	2006	NCP	
Belinda Bidwell	2006	2007	Ind	
Fatoumata Jahumpa Ceesay	2007	2009	APRC	
Elizabeth Renner	2009	2010	APRC	
Abdoulie Bojang	2010	2017	APRC	
Mariam Jack-Denton	2017	2022	UDP	
Fabakary Jatta	2022	Incumbent	APRC	
