= 1994 Gambian coup d'état =

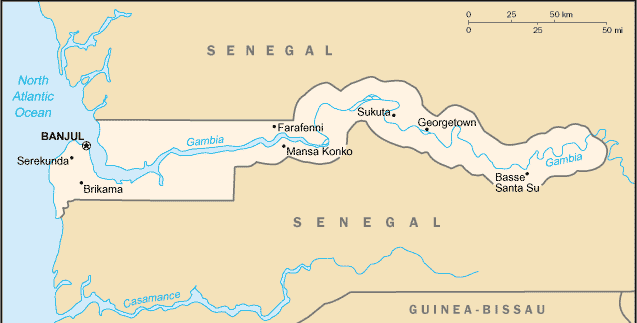
- Map of The Gambia
Date	22 July 1994; 32 years ago
Location	The Gambia
Result	Coup successful: Government of Dawda Jawara is overthrown; Military junta established; Yahya Jammeh installed as president

Belligerents
(The Gambia) Government of the Gambia	Armed Forces faction Supported by: Libya (alleged)

Commanders and leaders
(The Gambia) Dawda Jawara	Yahya Jammeh

In the 1994 Gambian coup d'état, a group of soldiers led by 29-year-old Lieutenant Yahya Jammeh seized power in a coup d'état on the morning of 22 July, ousting Dawda Jawara, who had been President of The Gambia since it became a Republic in 1970.

The coup plotters dissolved the government, arrested government members, and abolished the constitution. The coup led to the installment of Yahya Jammeh as president, who ruled The Gambia as an authoritarian for 22 years.

== Background ==
The coup of 1994 was spontaneous; it was not planned but rather a mutiny that eventually turned into a coup. The mutiny had been planned the night before its execution, leaving much to chance. Despite its spontaneity, the sentiments behind the coup had been developing since the attempted coup of 1981. The primary complaints of supporters of the coup included perceived government economic mismanagement, as well as grievances among soldiers.

=== Declining legitimacy of the government ===
In the 1992 election, the People's Progressive Party (PPP) maintained a comfortable 58.2% share of the vote; there was, however, a sharp decline in government legitimacy almost immediately after the election. Citizens increasingly felt that the government was no longer responsive to their needs and had been acting in its own self-interest. Citizens argued that the government had become complacent as a result of its comfortable hold on power since the nation's independence 29 years earlier. This sentiment was particularly present among younger voters and youth groups, who felt under-represented by the patriarchal nature of President Dawda Jawara's government. They believed the only route to fair representation had to be outside the Jawara government and thus they were some of the coup's greatest proponents.

At the same time, the uncovering and investigation of multiple ongoing scandals revealed the corruption of the Gambian Government. The Jawara government had been embroiled in a scandal involving three high-ranking government officials accused of embezzling millions of dollars from union funds in late 1993. Jawara and his government were reluctant to investigate this scandal and once the officials' guilt was proven they were even more reluctant to punish them, except for seizing and auctioning their houses. This made many citizens very sceptical of the government's complacency with corruption; eventually, domestic pressures resulted in the establishment in June 1994 of a commission to investigate. Jawara's attempt to regain the trust of the people came far too late; the commission had not reached a conclusion in time to save the regime. This incident, and many other scandals, led to the Armed Forces Provisional Ruling Council (AFPRC) continually rebuking the Jawara regime for its corruption, despite Jawara's objection that "the extent of corruption under the PPP was nothing like as great as claimed by the AFPRC". This was confirmed later in November 1994 when an investigation uncovered considerable corruption and mismanagement of the Jawara government, including accusations of tax noncompliance, the distribution of favourable lands in Banjul to the administration, overpayment of travel expenses, theft of state resources and the nonpayment of government loans.

=== Ineffectiveness of the Jawara government ===
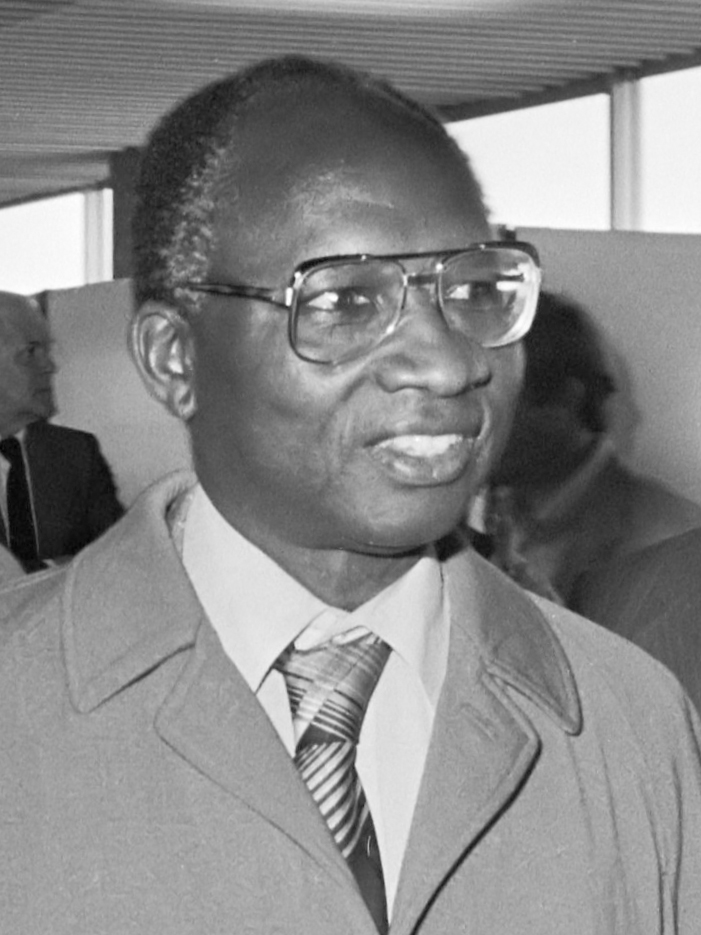
Popular discontent with President Dawda Jawara (pictured 1979) contributed to the push for a coup.

Another factor leading to the discontent of the Gambian people was the ineffective nature of the Jawara government, which many accused of being ineffectual in its final months, arguing that governmental corruption prevented the country from progressing. Following the December 1992 establishment of the Assets Management and Recovery Commission (AMRC), which aimed to recover debts accrued by Gambian citizens and government officials, the ineffectiveness of government programs became increasingly clear. It was argued that the government had deliberately resisted AMRC efforts to collect debt and had purposefully limited its collecting powers; a result of the government's reluctance for its own debts to be collected. This resulted in more accusations involving the ineffective, corrupt and tyrannical nature of the Jawara government, which even argued the PPP was responsible for the underdevelopment of the country.

=== Discontent in the military ===
Though there was discontent among the Gambian public, the coup was executed by junior officers of the Gambian National Army (GNA). It was preceded by growing dissatisfaction in the military. Some of the chief concerns of the GNA included the disparity of living conditions between Nigerian senior officers and Gambian junior officers, which they believed to be indicative of a broader, corrupted structuring of the government. The officers argued the increased incorporation of foreign senior officers into the GNA limited their own opportunities for advancement within the military. The junior officers became angry when they had not received pay for a number of months; they began to plan a mutiny that would later develop into a coup d'état.

== Coup ==
On 21 July 1994, the USS La Moure County docked in Banjul for an international courtesy call and to conduct a joint training exercise with the GNA the next day. This was broadcast on Gambian radio stations, making public the knowledge that there would be a lack of military presence in The Gambia the next day. With this advantage, along with unrestricted and unmonitored access to military-grade vehicles and the armory, the coup was executed before the GNA had a chance to respond. At 7:30 a.m. the next day, the coup was set in motion at Yundum Barracks, 25 kilometers (15 mi) away from the capital. The coup began as a protest staged by disgruntled lieutenants and junior officers of the GNA, who planned to make demands regarding their lack of pay. The GNA, under the command of these junior officers, seized the airport, a radio station and a power station. Hours later, Jawara and his family fled to the La Moure County in an attempt to gain the protection and possible support of the United States Marine Corps. After being denied intervention by the Americans, the ship left Banjul that afternoon and docked in Dakar, where Jawara disembarked under the protection of American warships. With Jawara having fled the country, the coup organizers were free to secure their control over it and begin the establishment of their own government, which became known as the Armed Forces Provisional Ruling Council (AFPRC) and governed The Gambia until 1996, when a civilian party replaced it. As the most senior officer of the coup organizers, Jammeh was elected to lead the AFPRC shortly after its establishment.

Coup organizers included Sana Sabally, Edward Singhateh, Basiru Barrow, Alhaji Kanteh, and Alpha Kinteh. Kanteh and Kinteh withdrew from the plans because they believed the protest was poorly timed; their withdrawal led to the inclusion of Hydara and Jammeh into the coup plans.

== Effects of the coup ==
=== Immediate effects ===
Immediately following the coup, its leaders banned all opposition parties, established the Armed Forces Provisional Ruling Council (AFPRC) as the ruling government of the Gambia, and suspended the constitution of 1970. Jammeh and other coup organizers took further steps to gain public and political support while suppressing all possibilities of opposition to the intervention. In the days following the coup, Jammeh made a number of speeches to both internal and external audiences in which he dedicated himself and the AFPRC to improving the transparency, integrity and accountability of the Gambian government. This move was primarily to gain support or neutrality, asserting that the military intervention was necessary to uphold national interests. In their speeches, the coup leaders also denounced the Jawara government, dedicated themselves to the protection of human rights, and to governing under the rule of law.

The coup leaders took over national radio stations and imposed harsh restrictions on the press (which had had considerable liberties under the Jawara government) to prevent the broadcasting of opposition sentiments. These tighter restrictions led to the imprisonment and exile of several Gambian journalists who expressed anti-coup sentiments. The restrictions also resulted in the deportation of other West African journalists, most often on charges dating to colonial rule and with politically charged biases. Human rights violations were not limited to journalists and vocal protesters of the coup: Jammeh's most controversial policies included the re-establishment of the death penalty, which was mostly reserved for political opponents and attempted coup leaders. Through these acts, Jammeh and the other coup leaders were able to legitimize the coup, the new ruling government and the PPP, both internally and internationally. Leading up to the September 1996 election, Jammeh changed the AFPRC from a ruling military body into the Alliance for Patriotic Reorientation and Construction (APRC), and began to campaign as the nominee for the new party. Jammeh won this election, partially due to the lack of major opposition parties, thus legitimizing his government.

Jammeh committed himself and the government to providing more public goods to Gambians. In the first few years after the coup, his administration constructed two new high schools, five new middle schools, a large rural hospital, several rural clinics and the country's first television station.

=== Responses to the coup ===
The coup itself had very little political, military or public resistance, a relief to many Gambians after the bloody attempted coup of 1981. The only resistance to the coup came from Tactical Support Group (TSG) officers – who quickly realized that they were outnumbered and outgunned and surrendered their weapons – and from Jawara himself. Jawara begged the coup leaders to return to their barracks but they refused. Despite the paucity of resistance, one of the first acts of the coup leaders was to ban all opposition parties. Many leaders of these parties eventually became nominees for the United Democratic Party (UDP), established in September 1996. In the public sphere, there was a generally positive attitude toward the military intervention, particularly among urban young people, who felt most under-represented in the Jawara era. A study conducted by Wiseman later found that most public supporters of the coup actually opposed it privately but were too afraid to openly declare their opposition.

The internal neutrality towards the coup was also reflected in international reactions. After Jawara's flight to the US warship La Moure County in an attempt to secure US military intervention and protection, the US ambassador, following talks with his government, refused to send marines to suppress the coup, disappointing Jawara and other officials of his government. Jawara then was transported to Dakar, the capital of Senegal, by the US warship. He once again asked for military intervention from Senegal. Senegal offered Jawara and many of his officials political asylum but, viewing the coup as a low-ranking affair, refused to offer military assistance. Senegal went on to become the first country to recognize the newly established government in The Gambia as legitimate. The United Kingdom, despite its adamant support of the Jawara regime, also failed to take action to suppress the coup. The British had contested that the "rebellion" in Gambia would be over in a matter of days and there was little need for British intervention. Despite this initial neutrality towards the subject, sanctions and restrictions were placed on the new regime from November 1994. In response to the coup and the suspension of democracy in the Gambia, major donors such as the EU, US and Japan froze all humanitarian aid to The Gambia and issued travel warnings for the region. In response, the AFRPC established the National Consultative Committee (NCC) to survey public opinion about the coup and the new ruling government. The regime accepted the suggestions of the NCC and shortened the rule of the AFPRC from four years to two before transitioning to "democratic rule."

== Wider context ==
The end of the Cold War and the collapse of the Soviet Union encouraged liberalization and democratization movements in much of Africa; for this reason, the period from 1974 to the mid-1990s is considered the third wave of democratization in Africa, in which many countries changed from militaristic and autocratic states into democracies. Many Western scholars hoped the number of military governments in Africa would continue to decrease, both numerically and in power, in the following decades. Because The Gambia had become a more autocratic state in that period, many scholars consider it paradoxical. The 1994 coup in The Gambia marked the end of the longest-lasting democracy in West Africa and the deposition of one of Africa's longest-serving heads of state.

== See also ==
- Arch 22
- 1981 Gambian coup attempt
- 2014 Gambian coup attempt
