= National Assembly of the Gambia =

Unicameral legislature of the Gambia

Coordinates: 13°27′37″N 16°34′53″W

Type
- Type: Unicameral

History
- Founded: 1997
- Preceded by: House of Representatives of the Gambia

Leadership
- Speaker: Fabakary Jatta (APRC) since 17 April 2022
- Deputy Speaker: Seedy Njie (NPP) since 17 April 2022
- Majority Leader: Bilay G. Tunkara (NPP) since 17 April 2022
- Minority Leader: Alhagie S. Darboe (UDP) since 17 April 2022

Structure
- Seats: 58
- Political groups: Government (29): NPP (22); NRP (4); APRC (3); Opposition (29): UDP (15); Independents (12)^{α}; PDOIS (2)

Elections
- Voting system: First-past-the-post voting in single-member constituencies plus 5 members appointed by the President
- First election: 2 January 1997
- Last election: 9 April 2022
- Next election: 10 April 2027

Meeting place
- Parliament Buildings, Banjul

Website
- www.assembly.gm

The National Assembly of the Gambia is the unicameral legislature of the Gambia. The authorisation for the National Assembly lies in Chapter VII of the Constitution of the Gambia. It is composed of 53 members directly elected through first past the post, and a further five members appointed by the President.

== Composition and electoral system ==
The National Assembly is unicameral and consists of 58 members who serve a five-year term. 53 members are directly elected while the remaining five are appointed by the President. Members are elected in single-member constituencies using the simple majority, or first-past-the-post system.

== History ==
Legislative representation based on universal adult suffrage in the Gambia began in May 1962, when elections were held for a 32-seat House of Representatives. These elections were won by the People's Progressive Party (PPP), which was led by Dawda Jawara. After independence in 1965, the PPP continued to dominate the House of Representatives by winning a series of free, democratic elections in 1966, 1972, 1977, 1982, 1987, and 1992. While opposition parties were continuously present in the House, they were never able to successfully wrest power from the PPP. Jawara's government was overthrown in July 1994 by a military coup led by Yahya Jammeh. The constitution and all elected institutions, including the House of Representatives, were dissolved. After the coup, all political party activities were banned. The ban was lifted in August 1996 following the approval of a new constitution, but three Jawara-era parties – the PPP, the Gambian People's Party (GPP), and the National Convention Party (NCP) remained banned.

Legislative elections to the renamed National Assembly took place on 2 January 1997. Jammeh's Alliance for Patriotic Reorientation and Construction (APRC) won 33 out of 45 seats, the opposition United Democratic Party (UDP) won 7 seats, 2 seats were won by the National Reconciliation Party (NRP) and Independents each, and the People's Democratic Organization for Independence and Socialism (PDOIS) won the remaining seat.

The Independent Electoral Commission (Gambia) (IEC) lifted the ban on the PPP, GPP, and NCP in August 2001, five months before the next scheduled legislative election.

On April 7, 2017, the IEC announced that UDP had won a majority of 31 seats out of 53 available during the 2017 legislative elections.

On 17 April 2022, the sixth legislature was sworn in after the 2022 elections. The electoral alliance of the National People's Party (NPP) with the APRC and the NRP gave the pro-government bloc a majority, with 29 seats.

== Leadership ==
The current leadership of the National Assembly is as follows: APRC leader Fabakary Jatta as assembly speaker, Seedy Njie as deputy speaker, Bilay G. Tunkara as majority leader and UDP politician Alhagie S. Darboe as minority leader. The Speaker and Deputy Speaker may only be chosen from among the presidential appointees to the National Assembly, not the elected members. Speakers of the National Assembly are considered impartial presiding officers, although they may cast tie-breaking votes.

Role	Term of Office	Party
Speaker of the National Assembly
Mustapha B. Wadda	1997–2002	APRC
Sheriff Mustapha Dibba	2002–2006	NCP
Belinda Bidwell	2006–2007	Ind
Fatoumatta Jahumpa Ceesay	2007–2010	APRC
Abdoulie Bojang	2010–2017	APRC
Mariam Jack-Denton	2017–2022	UDP
Fabakary Jatta	2022–present	APRC
Deputy Speaker of the National Assembly
Cecilia Cole	1997–2000	APRC
Belinda Bidwell	2002–2006	Ind
George Aziz	2006–2007	APRC
Abdoulie Bojang	2007–2010	APRC
Fatou Mbye	2010–2017	APRC
Momodou L. K. Sanneh	2017–2022	UDP
Seedy Njie	2022–present	NPP
Majority Leader
Tamsir Jallow	1997–2002	APRC
Baba Jobe	2002–2003	APRC
Churchill Baldeh	2003–2007	APRC
Fabakary Jatta	2007–2017	APRC
Kebba K. Barrow	2017–2022	UDP
Bilay G. Tunkara	2022–present	NPP
Minority Leader
Kemesseng Jammeh	1997–2002	UDP
Halifa Sallah	2002–2007	PDOIS
Momodou L. K. Sanneh	2007–2012	UDP
Samba Jallow	2012–2022	NRP
Alhagie S. Darboe	2022–present	UDP

== Notes ==
^α Independents are listed as part of the opposition by default.

== See also ==
- History of the Gambia
- Politics of the Gambia
- List of speakers of the National Assembly of the Gambia
- List of NAMs elected in the 2022 Gambian parliamentary election
