= United Democratic Party (The Gambia) =

Political party in the Gambia

- Abbreviation: UDP
- Leader: Ousainou Darboe
- Founded: 1996
- Merger of: People's Progressive Party; National Convention Party; Gambian People's Party
- Ideology: Social democracy
- Political position: Centre-left
- International affiliation: Socialist International (consultative)
- National Assembly: 15 / 58

Website
- udp.gm

The United Democratic Party (abbr. UDP) is a political party in the Gambia, founded in 1996 by 3 political parties banned by the government of Yahya Jammeh (the PPP, NCP and GPP) led by human rights lawyer and freedom fighter Ousainou Darboe. It is the largest opposition party in the National Assembly since 2022.

A prominent opposition party to the ruling government of Yahyah Jammeh and the Alliance for Patriotic Reorientation and Construction party, the UDP ran Darboe as its candidate in every presidential election from 1996 to 2011, with Darboe coming second to Jammeh each time. After Darboe was jailed by the government in April 2016, the UDP selected former UDP deputy treasurer Adama Barrow as its new leader and candidate for the 2016 presidential election. The UDP established Coalition 2016, a coalition of seven opposition parties, and the coalition endorsed Barrow as its candidate. Barrow officially resigned from the UDP to run as an independent candidate endorsed by the coalition. Barrow then won the election in an upset victory. When Jammeh refused to accept the election result, he was forcibly removed from office by a regional military intervention, and after Barrow's inauguration, Darboe was released from prison.

In the lead-up to the 2021 presidential election, Coalition 2016 collapsed, and the party once again ran Darboe as their candidate, who lost the election and received 27.7% of the vote. In the 2022 National Assembly election, the party won 15 of the 53 available seats.

== Electoral history ==
=== Presidential elections ===
Election	Party candidate	Votes	%	Result
1996	Ousainou Darboe	141,387	35.84%	Lost ✗
2001	Ousainou Darboe	149,448	32.59%	Lost ✗
2006	Ousainou Darboe	104,808	26.69%	Lost ✗
2011	Ousainou Darboe	114,177	17.36%	Lost ✗
2016	Adama Barrow (Note: Ran as an independent candidate endorsed by Coalition 2016.)	227,708	43.29%	Won ✓
2021	Ousainou Darboe	238,253	27.72%	Lost ✗

=== National Assembly elections ===
Election	Leader	Votes	%	Seats	+/–	Position	Government
1997	Ousainou Darboe	104,568	33.97%	7 / 45	▲7	▲2nd	Opposition
2002	Ousainou Darboe	Election boycotted		0 / 49	▼7	—N/a	Extra-parliamentary
2007	Ousainou Darboe	57,545	21.84%	4 / 49	▲4	▲2nd	Opposition
2012	Ousainou Darboe	Election boycotted		0 / 48	▼4	—N/a	Extra-parliamentary
2017	Ousainou Darboe	142,146	37.47%	31 / 53	▲31	▲1st	Coalition (UDP-NRP-PPP)
2022	Ousainou Darboe	138,176	28.04%	15 / 53	▼16	▼2nd	Opposition
