= Alliance for Patriotic Reorientation and Construction =

Political party in the Gambia

- Leader: Fabakary Jatta
- Founder: Yahya Jammeh
- Founded: 1996
- Headquarters: Banjul
- Ideology: Social conservatism Militarism
- Political position: Right-wing
- Colors: Green
- National Assembly: 3 / 58
- Pan African Parliament: 4 / 5

The Alliance for Patriotic Reorientation and Construction (APRC) is a political party in the Gambia. Founded by army officers who staged the 1994 coup, it was the dominant party of the Gambia from 1996 to 2016 under president Yahya Jammeh. While there is not a specific ideology that the party embraces, its first leader, Yahya Jammeh, advocated during his leadership over the Republic of The Gambia for a liberal market economy.

== History ==
The APRC was formed in 1996 to support coup organiser Yahya Jammeh's successful campaign in the 1996 presidential election. The party would rule over the country for the next twenty years, with subsequent elections being heavily controversial and the APRC facing very little opposition. For instance, no other candidates ran in 33 of the 45 National Assembly seats won by the APRC in the 2002 parliamentary elections, as the main opposition party, the United Democratic Party boycotted what it described would be an unfair election.

Despite such criticisms, the APRC was described as very popular amongst the Jola ethnic group. In terms of nationwide percentage, the party's best parliamentary election result was in 2007 (59.7%), while its best presidential election result came in 2011 (71.5%).

Jammeh was ultimately denied a fifth term in the 2016 presidential election by opposition candidate Adama Barrow, and the APRC lost a whopping 38 seats in the parliamentary elections the following year, going into opposition for the first time.

Fabakary Jatta, the current leader of the APRC, has sought to distance the party from Jammeh and the alleged crimes committed under his twenty year rule. In 2021, Jatta endorsed Barrow's 2021 re-election campaign. Jammeh criticised the endorsement. After the 2022 parliamentary election resulted in a hung parliament for the first time in the country's history, the APRC formed a coalition agreement with Barrow's National People's Party. This caused internal turmoil, as many APRC members, including some within the party establishment, remain loyal to Jammeh.

== Electoral history ==
=== Presidential elections ===
Election	Candidate	Votes	%	Results
1996	Yahya Jammeh	220,011	55.8%	Elected ✓
2001	Yahya Jammeh	242,302	52.8%	Elected ✓
2006	Yahya Jammeh	264,404	67.3%	Elected ✓
2011	Yahya Jammeh	470,550	71.5%	Elected ✓
2016	Yahya Jammeh	208,487	39.6%	Lost ✗

=== National Assembly elections ===
Election	Party leader	Votes	%	Seats	+/–	Position	Government
1997	Yahya Jammeh	160,470	52.13%	33 / 49	New	▲1st	Supermajority
2002	Yahya Jammeh	29,097	51.05%	45 / 53	▲12	1st	Supermajority
2007	Yahya Jammeh	157,392	59.70%	42 / 53	▼3	1st	Supermajority
2012	Yahya Jammeh	80,289	51.82%	43 / 53	▲1	1st	Supermajority
2017	Fabakary Jatta	60,331	15.91%	5 / 53	▼38	▼3rd	Opposition
2022	Fabakary Jatta	15,710	3.19%	2 / 53	▼3	▼5th	Coalition (NPP-NRP-APRC)
