= President of the Gambia =

Head of state and government

President of the Republic of The Gambia
- Presidential emblem

- Presidential Flag

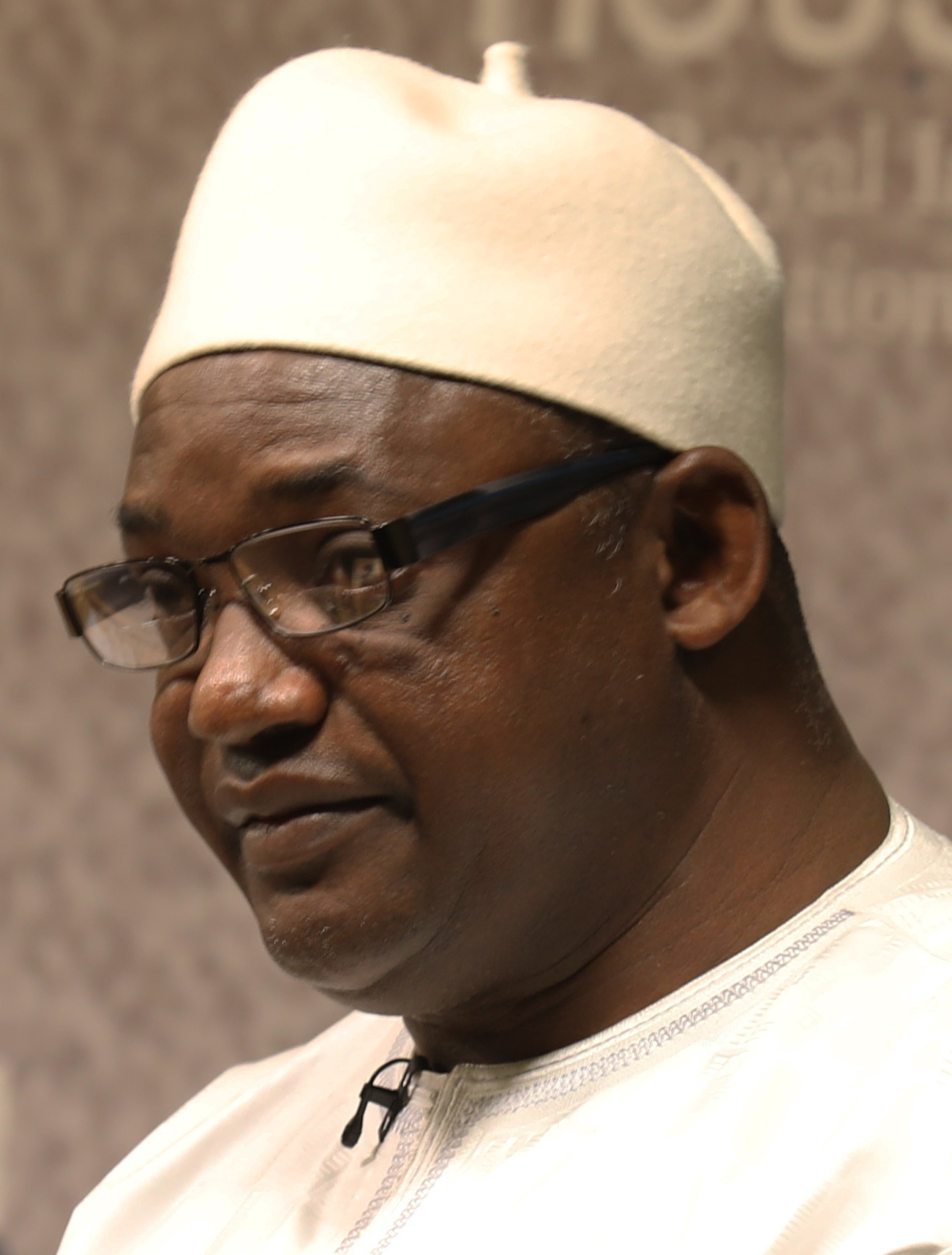
- Incumbent; Adama Barrow since 19 January 2017
- Residence: State House, Banjul
- Term length: Five years, renewable
- Constituting instrument: Constitution of Gambia (1997)
- Inaugural holder: Sir Dawda Jawara
- Formation: 24 April 1970; 56 years ago
- Deputy: Vice-President of The Gambia
- Salary: 65,000 USD annually
- Website: op.gov.gm

The president of the Republic of the Gambia is the head of state and head of government of the Gambia. The president leads the executive branch of the government of the Gambia and is the commander-in-chief of the Gambia Armed Forces. The post was created in 1970, when the Gambia became a republic and has been held by three people: Sir Dawda Jawara, who ruled from 1970 until 1994, Yahya Jammeh, who seized power in a bloodless coup that year and Adama Barrow, who defeated Jammeh in elections held in December 2016.

As of 2021, there are no term limits for the president in the Constitution of the Gambia.

== See also ==
- List of colonial governors of the Gambia
- List of heads of government of the Gambia
- Lists of office-holders
