= Cabinet of Adama Barrow =

Members of President Adama Barrow's cabinet

- Cabinet of The Gambia

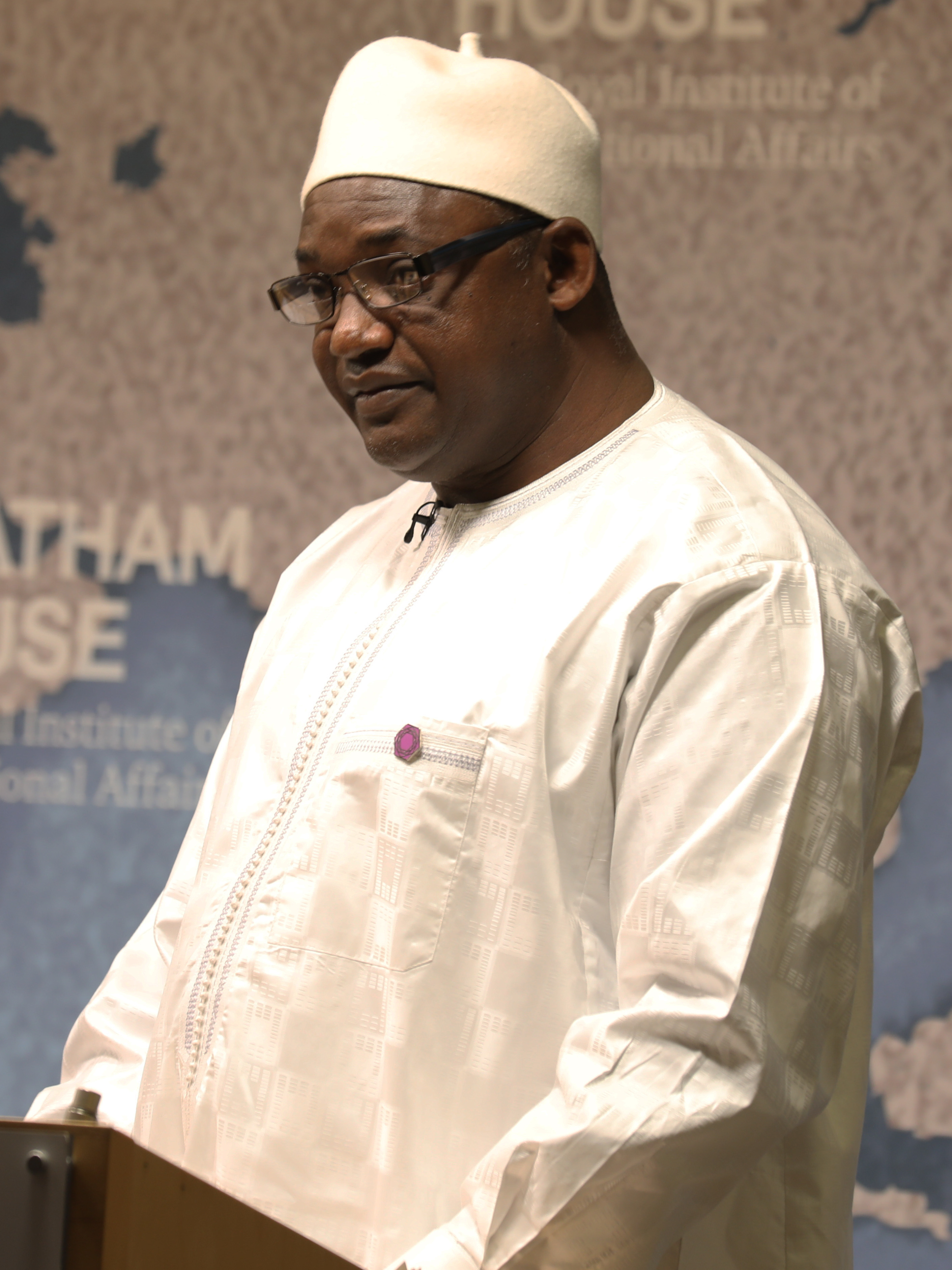
- Adama Barrow in 2018
- Date formed: 19 January 2017

People and organisations
- President: Adama Barrow
- Vice President: Fatoumata Tambajang (2017–2018); Ousainou Darboe (2018–2019); Isatou Touray (2019–2022); Badara Joof (2022–2023); Muhammad B. S. Jallow (since 2023)
- No. of ministers: 18
- Member parties: National People's Party (since 2019); National Reconciliation Party (since 2017); Alliance for Patriotic Reorientation and Construction (since 2022); Former: United Democratic Party (2017–2022); People's Progressive Party (2017–2022); National Convention Party (2017–2019); Gambia Moral Congress (2017); Gambia Party for Democracy and Progress (2017–2018)
- Status in legislature: Coalition government 29 / 58 (50%)
- Opposition parties: Alliance for Patriotic Reorientation and Construction (2017–2022); Gambia Democratic Congress (2017–2022); People's Democratic Organisation for Independence and Socialism (since 2017); United Democratic Party (since 2022)
- Opposition leader: Samba Jallow (2017–2022); Alhagie S. Darboe (since 2022)

History
- Elections: 2016 presidential election 2017 parliamentary election 2021 presidential election 2022 parliamentary election
- Legislature terms: 5th National Assembly; 6th National Assembly
- Predecessor: Cabinet of Yahya Jammeh

Following his victory in the 2016 Gambian presidential election, the newly elected President Adama Barrow appointed a new cabinet to succeed the cabinet of Yahya Jammeh, his predecessor. Barrow was formally inaugurated on 19 January 2017 at the embassy of the Gambia in Dakar, Senegal, and was able to return to the Gambia on 26 January. He made the bulk of appointments in February 2017, and conducted major reshuffles in June 2018, March 2019 and May 2022.

== History ==
It was announced that Barrow would return to the Gambia from Senegal on 26 January 2017, having been sworn-in at the Gambian embassy there on 19 January due to the 2016–17 Gambian constitutional crisis. He said that his ministers would be announced on 31 January, and that they would have to declare their assets before taking up office. The names were in fact only revealed at their swearing-in on 1 February. Among the appointments were UDP treasurer and professional accountant Amadou Sanneh, women's rights activist Isatou Touray, UN prosecutor and lawyer Ba Tambadou, UDP leader and senior barrister Ousainou Darboe, NRP leader Hamat Bah, former agriculture minister Omar A. Jallow, and GMC leader and lawyer Mai Fatty.

Following the swearing-in ceremony, Barrow promised to appoint the remaining cabinet members by the end of the week. No members of the People's Democratic Organisation for Independence and Socialism (PDOIS) were appointed to the cabinet since they declined positions offered to them, though both Sidia Jatta and Halifa Sallah were to be part of Barrow's new think tank, the Agency For Sustainable Socio-Economic Development (ASSED). Five further appointments to the cabinet were made on 22 February, with Fatoumata Tambajang becoming Minister of Women's Affairs overseeing the Office of Vice-President.

Tambajang was formally sworn-in as Vice-President of the Gambia on 9 November 2017, after Barrow passed a constitutional amendment regarding the age limit. The first alteration was on 10 November, when Mai Fatty was relieved of his appointment as Minister of the Interior. He later denied that he was relieved due to being involved in corruption. 29 June 2018 saw a major cabinet reshuffle announced, with Ousainou Darboe becoming Vice-President, Mamadou Tangara becoming Minister of Foreign Affairs, and Mambury Njie becoming Minister of Finance and Economic Affairs, with several other shuffles and appointments. The new ministers were sworn-in during a ceremony on 9 July 2018.

== Composition ==
Cabinet
Office	Incumbent	Entered office	Left office	Party
Cabinet ministers
President	Adama Barrow	19 January 2017	Incumbent	NPP
Vice-President; Minister of Women's Affairs	Fatoumata Tambajang	22 February 2017	9 July 2018	Independent
Vice-President; Minister of Women's Affairs	Ousainou Darboe	9 July 2018	15 March 2019	UDP
Vice-President; Minister of Women's Affairs	Isatou Touray	15 March 2019	4 May 2022	Independent
Vice-President; Minister of Women's Affairs	Badara Joof	4 May 2022	17 January 2023	Independent
Vice-President; Minister of Women's Affairs	Muhammad B. S. Jallow	24 February 2023	Incumbent	Independent
Minister of Foreign Affairs	Ousainou Darboe	1 February 2017	9 July 2018	UDP
Minister of Foreign Affairs	Mamadou Tangara	9 July 2018	Incumbent	Independent
Minister of Defence	Sheikh Omar Faye	22 August 2019	Incumbent	Independent
Minister of Finance and Economic Affairs	Amadou Sanneh	1 February 2017	9 July 2018	UDP
Minister of Finance and Economic Affairs	Mambury Njie	9 July 2018	Incumbent	Independent
Minister of Tourism and Culture	Hamat Bah	1 February 2017	Incumbent	NRP
Minister of Higher Education, Research, Science and Technology	Badara Joof	22 February 2017	4 May 2022	Independent
Minister of Higher Education, Research, Science and Technology	Pierre Gomez	4 May 2022	Incumbent	Independent
Minister of Basic and Secondary Education	Claudiana Cole	22 February 2017	Incumbent	Independent
Minister of Health and Social Welfare	Saffie Lowe Ceesay	22 February 2017	9 July 2018	Independent
Minister of Health and Social Welfare	Isatou Touray	9 July 2018	27 March 2019	Independent
Minister of Health and Social Welfare	Ahmadou Lamin Samateh	27 March 2019	Incumbent	Independent
Minister of Agriculture	Omar A. Jallow	1 February 2017	9 July 2018	PPP
Minister of Agriculture	Lamin N. Dibba	9 July 2018	15 March 2019	UDP
Minister of Agriculture	Demba Sabally	4 May 2022	Incumbent	NPP
Minister of Trade, Industry, Regional Integration and Employment	Isatou Touray	1 February 2017	9 July 2018	Independent
Minister of Trade, Industry, Regional Integration and Employment	Amadou Sanneh	9 July 2018	15 March 2019	UDP
Minister of Forestry, Environment, Climate Change and Natural Resources	Lamin N. Dibba	1 February 2017	15 March 2019	NCP
Minister of Forestry, Environment, Climate Change and Natural Resources	Rohey John Manjang	4 May 2022	Incumbent	Independent
Minister of Fisheries and Water Resources (Note: Minister of Fisheries, Water Resources and National Assembly Matters until 2022.)	James F. P. Gomez	1 February 2017	4 May 2022	PPP
Minister of Fisheries and Water Resources	Musa Drammeh	4 May 2022	Incumbent	Independent
Minister of Energy and Petroleum	Fafa Sanyang FGS	10 April 2017	4 May 2022	Independent
Minister of Energy and Petroleum	Abdoulie Jobe	4 May 2022	Incumbent	Independent
Minister of Lands and Regional Government	Lamin N. Dibba	1 February 2017	9 July 2018	UDP
Minister of Lands and Regional Government	Musa Drammeh	9 July 2018	4 May 2022	Independent
Minister of Lands and Regional Government	Abba Sanyang	4 May 2022	1 July 2023	Independent
Minister of Lands and Regional Government	Ousman Sowe	1 July 2023	1 September 2023	Independent
Minister of Justice; Attorney General	Ba Tambadou	7 February 2017	30 June 2020	Independent
Minister of Justice; Attorney General	Dawda A. Jallow	30 June 2020	Incumbent	Independent
Minister of Information and Communication Infrastructure	Demba Ali Jawo	22 February 2017	9 July 2018	Independent
Minister of Information and Communication Infrastructure	Ebrima Sillah	9 July 2018	Incumbent	Independent
Minister of the Interior	Mai Fatty	1 February 2017	10 November 2017	GMC
Minister of the Interior	Habib Drammeh	4 December 2017	8 January 2018	Independent
Minister of the Interior	Ebrima Mballow	8 January 2018	22 August 2019	Independent
Minister of the Interior	Yankuba Sonko	22 August 2019	4 May 2022	Independent
Minister of the Interior	Seyaka Sonko	4 May 2022	Incumbent	Independent
Minister of Youth and Sports	Henry Gomez	1 February 2017	9 July 2018	GPDP
Minister of Youth and Sports	Hadrammeh Sidibeh	9 July 2018	30 September 2020	Independent
Minister of Youth and Sports	Bakary Y. Badjie	1 October 2020	Incumbent	Independent
Minister of Transport, Works and Infrastructure	Bai Lamin Jobe	22 February 2017	4 May 2022	Independent
Minister of Transport, Works and Infrastructure	Ebrima Sillah	4 May 2022	Incumbent	Independent
Also attending cabinet
Secretary General; Head of the Civil Service	Dawda Fadera	9 February 2017	8 January 2018	Independent
Secretary General; Head of the Civil Service	Habib Drammeh	8 January 2018	14 September 2018	Independent
Secretary General; Head of the Civil Service	Ebrima Camara	17 September 2018	22 August 2019	Independent
Secretary General; Head of the Civil Service	Muhammad B. S. Jallow	22 August 2019	25 May 2020	Independent
Secretary General; Head of the Civil Service	Noah Touray	26 May 2020	4 May 2022	Independent
Secretary General; Head of the Civil Service	Salimatta E. Touray	4 May 2022	Incumbent	Independent

== Other senior appointees ==
The President of the Gambia can also make other senior appointments that do not sit in the Cabinet. Barrow has made the following appointments:

=== Military and security ===
Role	Department	Holder	Entered office	Left office	Source
Chief of the Defence Staff	Gambia Armed Forces	Masaneh Kinteh	27 February 2017	5 March 2020	
Director	State Intelligence Services	Ousman Sowe	2 February 2017	13 February 2017	
Director	State Intelligence Services	Musa Dibbaa	13 February 2017	Incumbent	

=== Diplomacy ===
Role	Based	Holder	Entered office	Left office	Source
Ambassador to the United States	Washington, D.C., USA	Ebraima "Ebou" Manneh	7 March 2017	24 January 2018	
Ambassador to the United States	Washington, D.C., USA	Dawda Fadera	24 January 2018	20 February 2022	
Permanent Representative to the UN	New York, USA	Mamadou Tangara	3 May 2017	9 July 2018	
Permanent Representative to the UN	New York, USA	H.E. Lamin Lang Yabou	?	?	
Ambassador to Senegal	Dakar, Senegal	Ebrima Ndure	19 May 2017	Incumbent	
High Commissioner to the United Kingdom	London, United Kingdom	Francis Blaine	19 May 2017	Incumbent	
Permanent Representative to the EU	Brussels, Belgium	Teneng Mba Jaiteh	19 May 2017	Incumbent	

=== Office of the President ===
Role	Holder	Entered office	Left office	Source
Military Aide to the President	Masaneh Kinteh	25 January 2017	27 February 2017	
Director of Press and Public Relations	Amie Bojang-Sissoho	1 February 2017	Incumbent	
Special Advisor on Governance	Halifa Sallah	17 February 2017	17 February 2017	
Special Advisor on Religious and Traditional Affairs	Dembo Bojang	19 February 2017	Incumbent	
Special Advisor on Investment	Musa Drammeh	19 February 2017	9 July 2018	
National Security Advisor	Momodou Badjie	September 2017	Incumbent	

=== Other ===
Role	Department	Holder	Entered office	Left office	Source
Director-General	Gambia Prison Services	Ansumana Manneh	24 February 2017	?	
Director-General	Gambia Prison Services	Saikou Kawsu Gassama	?	14 October 2021	
Director-General	Gambia Radio & Television Service	Ebrima Sillah	15 February 2017	29 June 2018	
Director-General	Gambia Radio & Television Service	Abdou M. K. Touray	10 July 2018	28 February 2021	
Director-General	Gambia Radio & Television Service	Malick Jeng	1 March 2021	?	
Chief Justice	Supreme Court of the Gambia	Hassan Bubacar Jallow	15 February 2017	Incumbent	
