= List of Gambian politicians =

The following is a list of Gambian politicians, both past and present.

== B ==
- Bah, Hamat
- Bajo, Lamin Kaba
- Bala Gaye, Musa Gibril
- Bojang, Lamin
- Talib, Bensouda

== C ==
- Camara, Assan Musa
- Ceesay, Fatoumata Jahumpa
- Colley, Angela

== D ==
- Dabo, Bakary Bunja
- Darboe, Numukunda
- Darboe, Ousainou
- Darboe, Yankuba
- Dibba, Sheriff Mustapha

== F ==
- Faye, John C.
- Fatty, Mai Ahmad

== G ==
- Garba Jahumpa, Bala
- Garba-Jahumpa, Ibrahima Muhammadu

== J ==
- Jabang, Lamine Kitty
- Jagne, Baboucarr-Blaise
- Jallow, Omar
- Jammeh, Yahya
- Jatta, Sidia
- Jawara, Dawda
- Jobe, Momodou Lamin Sedat
- Joiner, Julia Dolly
- Joof, Alhaji A.E. Cham

== M ==
- Manjang, Rohey John

== N ==
- N'Jie, Pierre Sarr
- Njie, Aliu Badara
- Njie Saidy, Isatou (Aisatu N'Jie-Saidy)

== P ==
- Phatey, MJM Babung

== S ==
- Sallah, Halifa
- Sanneh, Sidi Moro
- Sey, Omar
- Singateh, Farimang Mamadi
- Singateh, Edward
- Sonko, Bolong

== T ==
- Touray, Yankuba
- Isatou Touray, the first woman to run for the Presidency of the Gambia
