= Momodou =

Momodou is a Gambian given name that may refer to:

- Momodou Alieu Bah, Gambian senior army officer
- Momodou Baboucar Njie (1929–2009), Gambian politician
- Momodou Ceesay (born 1988), Gambian football striker
- Momodou Ceesay (artist) (born 1945), Gambian fine artist and writer
- Momodou L. K. Sanneh (born 1942), Gambian politician
- Momodou Lion Njie (born 2001), Gambian footballer
- Momodou Malcolm Jallow (born 1975), Gambian-born Swedish politician
- Momodou Lamin Sedat Jobe (1944–2025), foreign minister of The Gambia
