= 2012 Gambian parliamentary election =

- 29 March 2012

48 of 53 seats in the National Assembly 27 seats needed for a majority
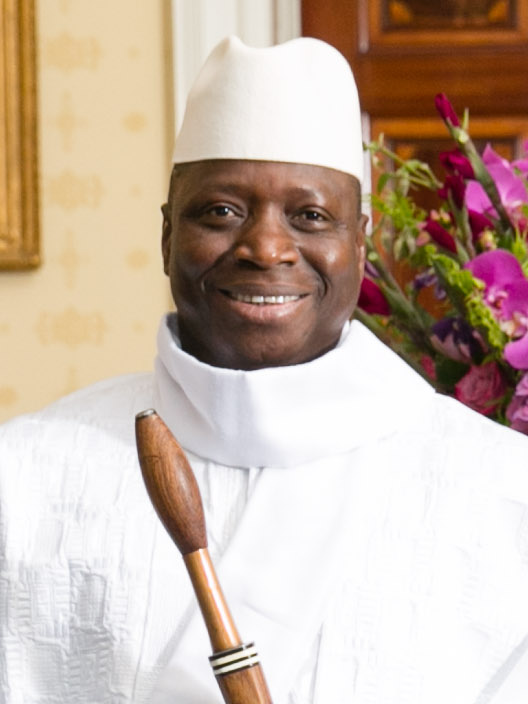

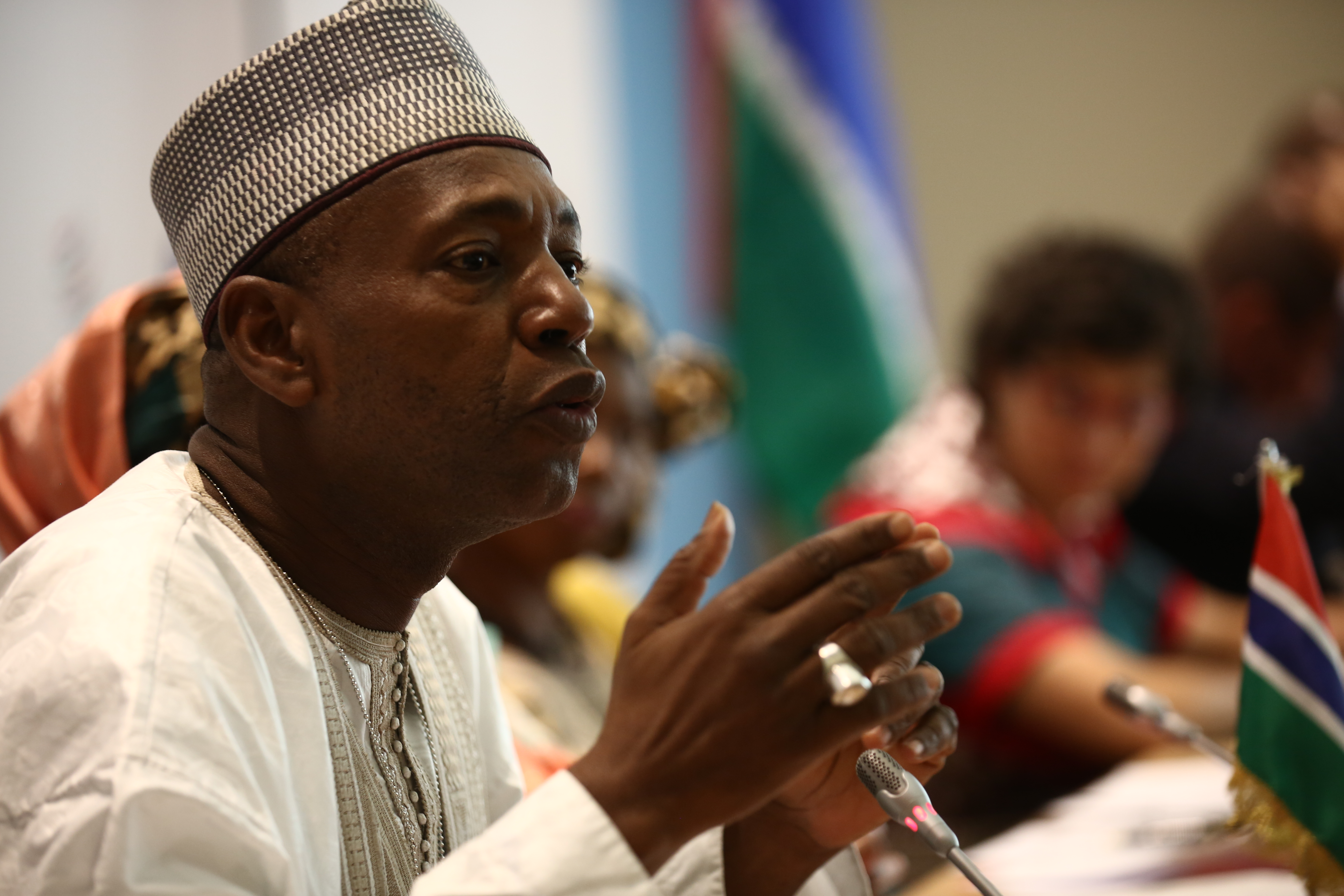
	First party	Second party
Leader	Yahya Jammeh	Hamat Bah
Party	APRC	NRP
Last election	42 seats	0 seats
Seats won	43	1
Seat change	▲1	▲1
Popular vote	80,289	14,606
Percentage	51.8%	9.45%

Parliamentary elections were held in the Gambia on 29 March 2012. The ruling Alliance for Patriotic Reorientation and Construction (APRC) won 43 of the 48 elected seats. Most opposition parties boycotted the election.

These were the last parliamentary elections held during the rule of president Yahya Jammeh.

== Electoral system ==
48 of the 53 members of the unicameral National Assembly were directly elected, with an additional five members appointed by the President. Due to the over 50% illiteracy rate in the country, voters would drop glass marbles into coloured drums based on the candidate they chose. Upon the marble hitting the bottom of each drum, a bell would sound to prevent voter fraud through multiple voting.

== Campaign ==
There were 86 candidates for 48 elected seats. 25 seats were won unopposed by the APRC.

Six opposition parties (United Democratic Party (UDP), People's Progressive Party, People's Democratic Organisation for Independence and Socialism, National Democratic Action Movement, Gambia Moral Congress, Gambia Party for Democracy and Progress, National Convention Party and the National Alliance for Democracy and Development) boycotted the elections, saying they were rigged in favour of the APRC, and after a request to postpone the election was rejected. The UDP's Ousainou Darboe said that the ruling party was "using government resources. They operate from the offices of the regional governors and from the offices of the various local authorities to operate." The grouping also called for ECOWAS to intervene. The grouping said that APRC had "an abuse of incumbency [as] complete merger between party and state" allowed for the ruling party to use state resources such as the media for "political advantage."

Hamat Bah's National Reconciliation Party (NRP) decided to participate in the elections. Bah made the decision on the premise that he could win back the seat lost after the founding of the National Alliance for Democracy and Development and was subsequently barred by a court ruling.

== Conduct ==
Electoral observers were present from the African Union, Commonwealth of Nations and the Organisation of Islamic Conference. Economic Community of West African States (ECOWAS), said it would not agree to monitor the election because, according to them, the election was not "free, fair and transparent." ECOWAS also criticised the AU for sending an observer mission.

== Results ==
Party	Votes	%	Seats	+/–
Alliance for Patriotic Reorientation and Construction	80,289	51.82	43	+1
National Reconciliation Party	14,606	9.43	1	+1
Independents	60,055	38.76	4	+3
Total	154,950	100.00	48	0
Total votes	154,950	–		
Registered voters/turnout	796,929	19.44		
Source: Independent Electoral Commission, IFES

== See also ==
- List of NAMs elected in the 2012 Gambian parliamentary election
