= Minister of Energy and Petroleum (The Gambia) =

The Minister of Energy and Petroleum is a cabinet-level position in the Gambia. It was formed in January 2016 by a merger of the positions of Minister of Petroleum and Minister of Energy. The incumbent minister is Nani Juwara, who serves in Adama Barrow's cabinet.

== History ==
The Ministry of Petroleum was responsible for petroleum exploration, as well as the development and production of crude oil in the Gambia. The Ministry of Energy was created in 2007 in order to implement government policy in relation to the supply of electricity, water management, petroleum products and renewable energy. The ministries were merged with effect from the 26 January 2016, to become the Ministry of Energy and Petroleum.

== Ministers of Petroleum, 1994–present ==
- Njogu Bah, 10 June 2013 – 12 June 2013
- Teneng Mba Jaiteh, 2013 – 2014
- Sirra Wally Ndow-Njie, 16 February 2015 – 18 April 2016

== Ministers of Energy, 2007 – 2016 ==
- Ousman Jammeh, May 2008 – 11 September 2009
- Authority transferred to Office of the President, 11 September 2009 – 22 December 2009
- Sirra Wally Ndow-Njie, 22 December 2009 – 7 June 2010
- Ousman Jammeh, 7 June 2010 – 28 June 2010
- Authority transferred to Office of the President, 28 June 2010 – ?
- Teneng Mba Jaiteh, ? – 12 August 2013
- Authority transferred to Office of the President, 12 August 2013 – 2 September 2013
- Teneng Mba Jaiteh, 2 September 2013 – 17 February 2014
- Vacant, 17 February 2014 – 21 February 2014
- Teneng Mba Jaiteh, 21 February 2014
- Edward Saja Sanneh, 17 June 2014 – 26 January 2016

== Ministers of Energy and Petroleum, 2017 – present ==
- Fafa Sanyang, 22 March 2017 – 4 May 2022
- Abdoulie Jobe, 4 May 2022 – 15 March 2024
- Nani Juwara, 15 March 2024 — present
