= Coalition 2016 =

Governing coalition of The Gambia

Gambia Coalition 2016 was the governing coalition of The Gambia in the late 2010s, consisting of seven Gambian political parties, civil society groups and one independent candidate created to field and support a unity ticket for the opposition in the 2016 presidential election. The coalition selected real estate developer and deputy treasurer (and presidential candidate) of the United Democratic Party (UDP) Adama Barrow as their candidate. Barrow officially left the UDP to allow him to run as an independent candidate, although his candidacy continued to be supported by the UDP through its membership in the coalition.

Apart from the UDP, the other parties in the coalition were the People's Democratic Organisation for Independence and Socialism (PDOIS), the National Reconciliation Party (NRP), the Gambia Moral Congress (GMC), the National Convention Party (NCP), the People's Progressive Party (PPP) and the Gambia Party for Democracy and Progress (GPDP). The independent female candidate and anti-female genital mutilation activist Dr Isatou Touray and a civil society group headed by Fatoumatta Tambajang also joined the coalition.

Barrow won the presidential election, unseating incumbent Yahya Jammeh after more than 20 years in power. Coalition 2016 members later worked together as a parliamentary supermajority in the first half of the National Assembly 2017–2022 term.

Their cooperation ended before the 2022 parliamentary elections, which the parties contested independently due to internal disputes. Barrow set up his own party centred around his leadership, and all Coalition 2016 members except the NRP went into opposition.

== Governance ==
The governing body of the coalition was the coalition executive, composed of the following members (sorted by alphabetical order):

- Hamat Bah (NRP)
- Dembo Bojang (UDP)
- Ousainou Darboe (UDP)
- Mai Fatty (GMC)
- Pa Omar Faye (Ind)
- Modou Bamba Gaye (NRP)
- James Gomez (PPP)
- Omar A. Jallow (PPP)
- Samba Jallow (NRP)
- Musa Jeng (Ind)
- Muhammed Magassy (Ind)
- Fatoumatta Tambajang (Ind)
- Isatou Touray (Ind)
- Sainey Touray (UDP)
- Buba Ayi Samateh (Ind)
- Halifa Sallah (PDOIS)
- Aji Yam Secka (UDP)
- Kebba F. Singhateh (Ind)
- Musa Sonko (NRP)
- Henry Gomez (GPDP)
- Dr. Lamin B. Bojang (NCP)
