= Fatou Mass Jobe-Njie =

Gambian politician

Ambassador of the Gambia to Malaysia
- In office 2014–2015
- President: Yahya Jammeh
- Succeeded by: Abubacarr Jah

Minister of Tourism and Culture
- In office 2010–2014
- President: Yahya Jammeh
- Preceded by: Nancy Njie
- Succeeded by: Benjamin Roberts

Personal details
- Spouse(s): Gumbo Tournay; Buna Njie
- Children: Ousman
- Education: University of Wolverhampton

Fatou Mass Jobe-Njie is a Gambian politician who served as Minister of Tourism and Culture from 2010 to 2014 and ambassador to Malaysia from 2014 to 2015.

== Early life and education ==
Jobe-Njie is from Serekunda. Her father died when she was young and her mother died a few years later. Jobe-Njie and her siblings were raised by their uncle. She attended Serre-Kunda Primary School and St. Joseph's High School.

Jobe-Njie has an MBA from the University of Wolverhampton.

== Career ==
Jobe-Njie worked in the private sector and headed the marketing department at Standard Chartered Bank, before heading the retail banking of Bank PHB. She also served as the chair of the Gambia Red Cross Society and in May 2010 was elected Chair of the Africa Travel Association.

Jobe-Njie was appointed Minister of Tourism and Culture by President Yahya Jammeh on 4 February 2010, replacing Nancy Njie. In 2013, she oversaw the establishment of the Gambia Collecting Society to collect and distribute royalties for Gambian artists under copyright law. In June 2014, she gave a speech at the OIC International Forum on the role of Islamic tourism in the global economy. She was sacked by Jammeh in September 2014, with no reason given. Two days later, she was appointed as Gambia's ambassador to Malaysia, the country's first permanent representative. She was replaced in that role by her deputy Abubacarr Jah in May 2015.

Jobe-Njie returned to Gambia and become a close aide to Zeinab Jammeh and executive director of Jammeh's charity, Operation Save the Children Foundation.

== Personal life ==
Jobe-Njie was married to university professor Gumbo Tournay, who many years later was acquitted of giving false information to the Office of President after speaking out about corruption at the University of the Gambia. Their son, Ousman, was born while they were living in London. After their divorce, Jobe-Njie married hotelier Buna Njie.

Political offices
Preceded by Nancy Njie	Secretary of State for Tourism and Culture; 2010–2014	Succeeded by Benjamin A. Roberts
