= Sonko =

Sonko may refer to:

- Edrissa Sonko (born 1980), Gambian footballer
- Djibril Sonko, Senegalese politician
- Ibrahima Sonko (born 1981), Senegalese footballer
- Moustapha Sonko (born 1972), French basketball player
- Noah Sonko Sundberg (born 1996), Swedish footballer
- Ousman Sonko (born 1969), Gambian politician
- Ousmane Sonko (born 1974), Senegalese politician
- Pa Ousman Sonko (born 1984), Gambian footballer
- Yankuba Sonko, Gambian police officer
