= Mai Fatty =

Gambian politician

Mai Ahmad Fatty
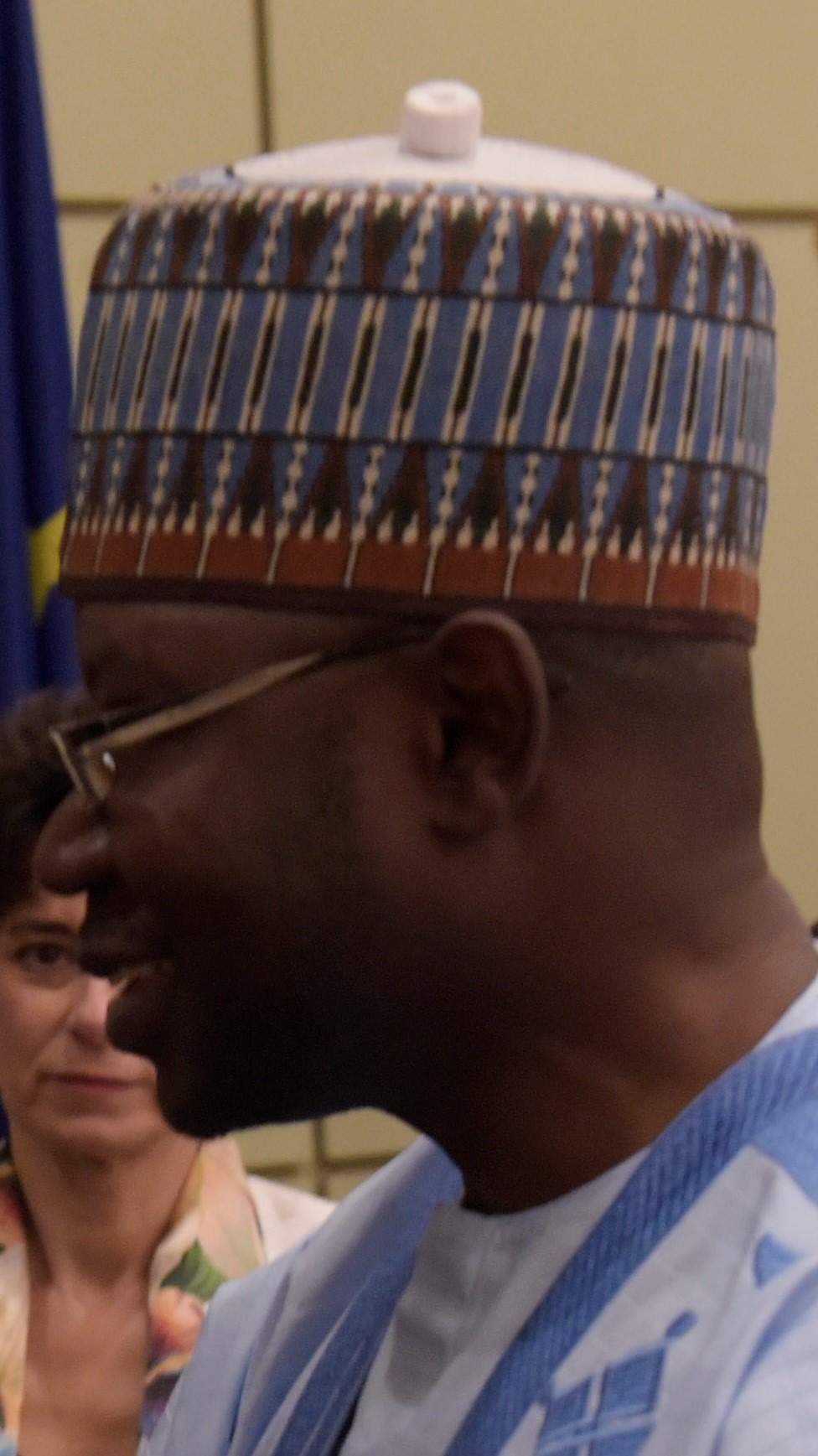

Minister of the Interior
- In office 1 February 2017 – 10 November 2017
- President: Adama Barrow
- Preceded by: Momodou Alieu Bah
- Succeeded by: Habib Saihou Drammeh (1949)

Leader of the Gambia Moral Congress
- Incumbent
- Assumed office 2009
- Preceded by: Party established

Personal details
- Born: Kerewan
- Party: Gambia Moral Congress
- Other political affiliations: Coalition 2016

Mai Ahmad Fatty is a Gambian lawyer and politician, who served as the Minister of the Interior under Adama Barrow. He founded the party Gambia Moral Congress in 2009, which he has led since then, which was founded in opposition to the ruling ARPC party.

== Early life and education ==
Fatty was born in Kerewan Village, Wuli east district in URD to a Muslim family. After initially completing his schooling in Kerewan, his family moved to Banjul where he completed his sixth form. He studied in Sierra Leone and Cyprus for his law degree.

== Legal career ==
After graduating with his degree, he was called up to the bar in The Gambia. After being called up, he started working in the law firm of Amie Bensouda, later leaving Bensouda's law firm to work as a barrister on his own, which he did for a decade before entering politics.

== Political career ==
After going into self-exile, claiming an assassination attempt was made on his life, he formed the Gambia Moral Congress in 2009. He later returned to the Gambia, at least until 2011, when he joined the main opposition party, UDP, in a coalition after stating the recent elections were not free and fair. He then went back into self-exile after Justice Minister Momodou Lamin Jobarteh threatened to indict him for his comments, eventually returning in 2016 after a five-year absence.

From 1 February to 10 November 2017 he was Minister of the Interior in President Adama Barrow's cabinet. Since 2009 he is the leader of the Gambia Moral Congress (GMC). From 2011 to November 2016, he left Gambia, after being threatened following the 2011 presidential election.

Ahead of much much-anticipated 2026 presidential election, he has joined the ruling National People's Party (NPP) grand coalition.

The move, according to them, is aimed at solidifying the ruling party ahead of the crucial 2026 presidential election. Furthermore, he has vowed to work with coalition partners in ensuring that Barrow won the forthcoming election calling it a "do-or-die" move. The NPP party's executive welcomed the GMC leaders and their supporters, describing the move as key ahead of the presidential election in 2026.
