= Abdoulie Dandeh-Njie =

Gambian sportsman and businessman (1937–2021)

- Born: 1 March 1937; Banjul, Gambia
- Died: 6 April 2021 (aged 84)
- Citizenship: Gambia
- Known for: Business management and sports
- Spouse(s): Clarissa Aino Norman, Zahra Bensouda
- Children: 6

Abdoulie Dandeh-Njie (1 March 1937 – 6 April 2021) was a Gambian sportsman and businessman.

== Biography ==
Dandeh-Nije was born in 1937 in Banjul, Gambia. He was educated at Koranic schools (Dara Pa Jobartehetc), Methodist Boys High School (now Gambia High School) and Westminster College, London.

When Dandeh-Nije was growing up he often played sports and excelled in cricket and football.

He died on 6 April 2021, at the age of 84.
