= Nancy Njie =

Gambian politician (1965–2025)

Secretary of State for Tourism and Culture of The Gambia
- In office 2008–2010
- President: Yahya Jammeh
- Preceded by: Angela Colley
- Succeeded by: Fatou Mass Jobe-Njie

Deputy mayor of Banjul City Council
- In office 2008–2008

Personal details
- Born: Nancy Seedy Njie; October 7, 1965
- Died: August 22, 2025 (aged 59)
- Education: Gambia High School

Nancy Seedy Njie (7 November 1965 – 22 August 2025) was a Gambian politician who served as the Secretary of State for Tourism and Culture from 2008 to 2010 under the presidency of Yahya Jammeh.

== Early life and early career ==
Njie studied at Gambia High School. Between 1984 and 1991, she worked at Gambia Airways. She began and worked at Gambia Ports Authority Canteen before her appointment to the Banjul City Council (BCC) in November 2007. Njie was elected deputy mayor of the council in February 2008.

== Political career ==
On March 19, 2008, President Yahya Jammeh sacked his two ministers: the Secretary of State for Information, Communication and Technology, Neneh Macdouall-Gaye, and the Secretary of State for Tourism, Angela Colley. Njie replaced Colley as the Secretary of State for Tourism and Culture of The Gambia, a post she held until 2010.

On 27 January 2009, Njie visited the Kachikally Museum and Crocodile Pool as part of her tourism activities. On August 7, 2009, she laid the foundation stone for the newly built Gambia Hotel School in Kanifing North.

== Personal life ==
Njie died on 22 August 2025, at the age of 59.

Political offices
Preceded by Angela Colley	Secretary of State for Tourism and Culture; 2008–2010	Succeeded by Fatou Mass Jobe-Njie
