= Muhammed Magassy =

Gambian politician

Muhammed Magassy is a Gambian independent politician, who has been the National Assembly Member for Basse since 2012.

== Political career ==
Magassy initially sought to be the APRC candidate for Basse constituency in the National Assembly during the 2012 election, but Selu Bah, the incumbent, was given the official APRC candidacy. Magassy, therefore, decided to contest the seat as an independent. In the election, Magassy won with 7045 votes to Bah's 4222 votes, so by a margin of 2823 votes. Ahead of the 2016 presidential election, Magassy served as a member of the executive of Coalition 2016, an opposition coalition backing Adama Barrow's candidacy. Magassy was re-elected at the 2017 parliamentary election, Magassy was re-elected. The United Democratic Party (UDP) ended up one short of a supermajority in the election, but it has been suggested that Magassy would support them in a vote where a supermajority was required.
