= Claudiana Cole =

Gambian politician, civil servant and educationalist

Minister of Basic and Secondary Education
- Incumbent
- Assumed office 22 February 2017
- President: Adama Barrow
- Preceded by: Fatou Lamin Faye

Personal details
- Party: Independent
- Education: Newcastle University

Claudiana Ayo Cole is a Gambian politician, civil servant and educationalist who is the current Minister of Basic and Secondary Education in President Adama Barrow's cabinet.

== Early life and education ==
Cole was the recipient of a Commonwealth Scholarship to study a Master of Education degree at Newcastle University.

== Professional and political career ==
Cole worked as the regional education director in the Upper River Region, officially Regional Education Directorate 6. In September 2014, Cole appeared in Brikama Magistrates’ Court in a dispute over President's Empowerment of Girls' Education Project (PEGEP) funding for female education at Model Senior Secondary School. In November 2015, she visited the Nasir Ahmadiyya Senior Secondary School and ordered it to be temporarily closed after members of the 'Green Youth' occupied it. Speaking in July 2016, she said that education "is about giving a person or a group of people the power and status in society. A group of people who unfortunately up to a little more than a decade ago were made to believe that their place was not in the school, but in the home and in the kitchen. While we understand that the home is usually considered as the first school for all humans, it is imperative that we move from the home to a formal schooling with a higher standard of learning involving organised processes; processes which provide a holistic development of the learner; cognitive and analytical."

On 22 February 2017, newly elected President of the Gambia Adama Barrow appointed Cole as Minister of Basic and Secondary Education.
