= Isatou Touray =

Vice President of the Gambia

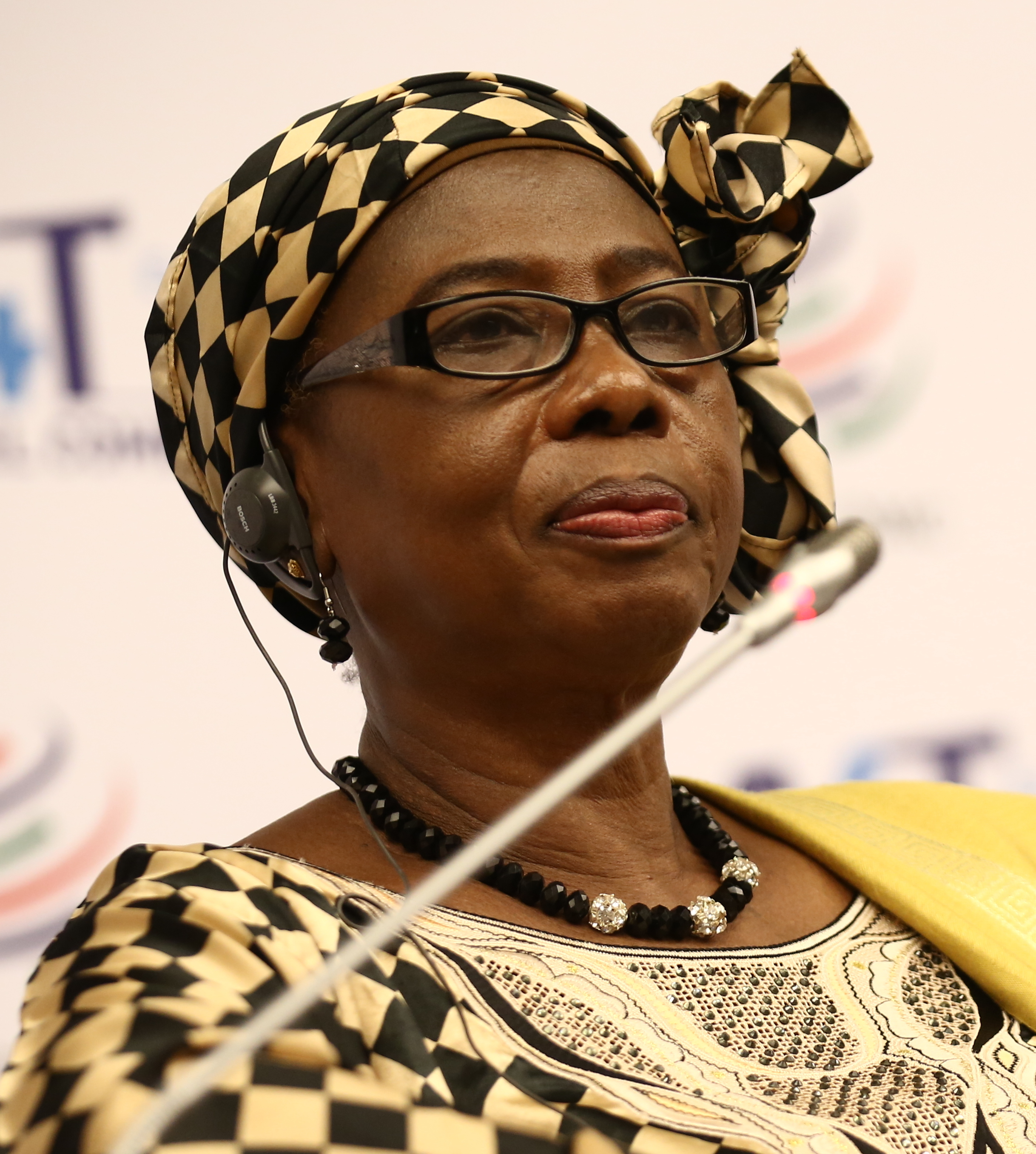
- Touray in 2017

10th Vice-President of the Gambia
- In office 15 March 2019 – 4 May 2022
- President: Adama Barrow
- Preceded by: Ousainou Darboe
- Succeeded by: Badara Joof

Minister of Health and Social Welfare
- In office 9 July 2018 – 27 March 2019
- President: Adama Barrow
- Preceded by: Saffie Lowe Ceesay
- Succeeded by: Ahmadou Lamin Samateh

Minister of Trade, Industry, Regional Integration and Employment
- In office 1 February 2017 – 9 July 2018
- President: Adama Barrow
- Preceded by: Abdoulie Jobe
- Succeeded by: Amadou Sanneh

Personal details
- Born: 17 March 1955 (age 71) Banjul, the Gambia
- Party: Independent
- Other political affiliations: Coalition 2016
- Education: Usmanu Danfodiyo University; International Institute of Social Studies; Institute of Development Studies

Isatou Touray (born 17 March 1955) is a Gambian politician, activist, and social reformer who served as Vice-President of the Gambia from 2019 to 2022. A noted campaigner against female genital mutilation (FGM), she became the first female Gambian presidential candidate in 2016, before dropping out to endorse Adama Barrow and Coalition 2016. She then served in Barrow's cabinet, as trade minister, then as health minister. On 15 March 2019, Touray became Vice-President of The Gambia, replacing her predecessor, Ousainou Darboe in a major cabinet reshuffle.

== Early life and education ==
Touray was born at the Royal Victoria Hospital, Bathurst, Colony of the Gambia, in 1955. She was brought up at 44 Grant Street in Bathurst, which was renamed Banjul in 1975. Her father was a native of Kaur. She attended Crab Island Secondary Technical School and was noted as a good athlete during her school days.

Touray attended Usman Danfodiyo University in Nigeria, graduating with a bachelor's degree in education and English. She then studied at the International Institute of Social Studies in The Hague, Netherlands, where she graduated with a master's degree in development studies. She completed a PhD in development studies at the Institute of Development Studies, University of Sussex, United Kingdom.

== Career ==
=== Social activism ===
Touray is noted as an activist against female genital mutilation (FGM). She co-founded the Gambia Committee on Traditional Practices (GAMCOTRAP) in 1984, which is committed to ending FGM. She became executive director of GAMCOTRAP, frequently calling on politicians to outlaw FGM, despite government restrictions on reporting of the issue. In a 1998 symposium, religious leaders and medical personnel came together to sign the Banjul Declaration, which condemned the use of FGM. From 2006 to 2011, Touray was chairperson of the Gambia Chapter of the West Africa Network for Peacebuilding (WANEP). She served as Secretary-General of the Inter-African Committee on Traditional Practices Affecting the Health of Women and Children from 2009 to 2014.

She also worked as deputy director of the Management Development Institute (MDI), where she founded a gender and development unit. However, she was forced to resign after repeated threats from authorities. She was twice arrested and accused on false charges, both times these were eventually dropped. The second time, she was only released after paying a €36,000 bail.

=== 2016 presidential election ===
Touray announced that she would run as an independent candidate in the 2016 presidential election on 2 September 2016. She became the first woman to run for President of the Gambia. During her announcement ceremony she said that, if elected, she would only serve a five-year term. Amie Bojang Sissoho chaired the meeting, and among the speakers were her husband and Fatoumata Tambajang. Her candidacy was supported by the Vanguard Africa Foundation. Touray said that, if elected, she would "restore the sovereignty of the people, end impunity and decentralise authority and power."

Opposition parties decided to form an electoral coalition to support one candidate in the election against Yahya Jammeh. Touray was initially part of the group that formed Coalition 2016, but was absent in their meeting on 30 October 2016 when delegates chose Adama Barrow as the candidate. However, on 4 November she announced her support for Barrow and withdrew from the race. Barrow subsequently won the 1 December election.

=== Ministerial career ===
Touray was appointed as Minister of Trade, Regional Integration and Employment in the Cabinet of Adama Barrow on 1 February 2017. In a July 2018 reshuffle, Touray was appointed as Minister of Health and Social Welfare. Her tenure as Vice President concluded on 4 May 2022, after which she became the interim Executive Director of global advocacy organization Uniting to Combat Neglected Tropical Diseases.

=== 2026 presidential election ===
In July 2026, Touray announced that she would be running for president in the 2026 presidential elections as an independent candidate. Her candidacy was accepted by the Independent Electoral Commission. Touray will be the sole female candidate at the election, running against incumbent president Barrow and her predecessor Ousainou Darboe.

== Personal life ==
She is married to Dr. Alhaji Malang Touray, a physician. They have four children and three grandchildren. Due to her activism, Dr. Touray has faced significant opposition throughout her career, including arrests and defamatory allegations.

== Recognition ==
- Women's Democracy Network's 2017 Jeanne J. Kirkpatrick Award
