= Jaiteh =

Jaiteh is a surname. Notable people with the surname include:

- Kumba Jaiteh (born 1988 or 1989), Gambian lawyer and politician
- Mouhammadou Jaiteh (born 1994), French basketball player
- Teneng Mba Jaiteh, Gambian politician
- Tijan Jaiteh (born 1988), Gambian footballer
