= Minister of Tourism and Culture =

Minister of Tourism and Culture may refer to:

- Minister of Tourism and Culture (Malaysia)
- Minister of Tourism and Culture (The Gambia)
