= List of high commissioners of the Gambia to the United Kingdom =

Coordinates: 51.516225°N 0.199516°W

High Commissioner of The Gambia to the United Kingdom
- Incumbent; Fatou Bensouda since 2022
- Inaugural holder: Louis Francis Valantine
- Formation: 1965

The Gambian High Commissioner in London is the official representative of the Government in Banjul to the Government of the United Kingdom.

== History ==
- In 2012 a proposal was made within the Commonwealth of Nations to address human rights, copyright and political corruption.
- Following the proposal, Kamalesh Sharma, Commonwealth Secretary General, met with Yahya Jammeh and other top officials.
- In late September 2013 the government of Yahya Jammeh realized that the Commonwealth is a neocolonial instrument and left it.
- The diplomatic representation of The Gambia in London changed from a High Commission to an embassy.
- The High Commissioner, Mrs. Harding presented her credentials as ambassador on October 23, 2013.
- The then Ambassador, Francis Blain, became High Commissioner on the 8 February 2018, as The Gambia returned to its membership of the Commonwealth under Adama Barrow, President of the Gambia.

== List of representatives ==
Diplomatic accreditation	ambassador	Observations	List of heads of state of the Gambia	Prime Minister of the United Kingdom	Term end
1965	Louis Francis Valantine		John Paul (colonial administrator)	Harold Wilson	1968
1971	Bocar Ousman Semega-Janneh	B. O. Semega Janneh born in London. On May 27, 1967 was mayor of Bathurst and appointed Ambassador to Senegal, residing in Dakar succeeding Alhajie Alieu Badara Njie	Dawda Jawara	Edward Heath	1980
1980	Omar A. Secka	Chargé d'affaires, 2004 HC in Lagos Nigeria.	Dawda Jawara	Margaret Thatcher	1982
1982	Abdullah Mamadu Kalifa Bojang		Dawda Jawara	Margaret Thatcher	1983
1983	Almad Tijan Sallah	Chargé d'affaires (* 1948)	Dawda Jawara	Margaret Thatcher	1984
1984	Samuel Jonathan Okikiola Sarr	(*April 1921)	Dawda Jawara	Margaret Thatcher	1987
1988	Horace Reginald Monday jr.	He was governor of the Central Bank of The Gambia.	Dawda Jawara	Margaret Thatcher	1991
1992	Mohammadou N. Bobb		Dawda Jawara	John Major	1995
1998	John Paul Bojang	February 2, 2000 until August 2000 he was ambassador in Washington, October 1, 2004 till September 20, 2006 he was Gambian ambassador to China in Taipei.	Yahya Jammeh	Tony Blair	2000
2001	Gibril Seman Joof	2006: The Gambia's ambassador to Senegal,	Yahya Jammeh	Tony Blair	2006
2006	Tamsir Jallow	2006: The Gambia's ambassador to Senegal,	Yahya Jammeh	Tony Blair	2007
April 2007	Elizabeth Ya Eli Harding - High Commissioner from 2007 to 2013, and ambassador from 2013 to 2017.		Yahya Jammeh	Gordon Brown	2018
2018	Francis Blain - Ambassador from 2017 to 2018, and High Commissioner from 2018 to 2022 - died in office		Yahya Jammeh Adama Barrow	Theresa May	2022
2023	Fatou Bensouda		Adama Barrow	Rishi Sunak	
