= 2011 Gambian presidential election =

- 24 November 2011
- Registered: 796,929
- Turnout: 82.55%
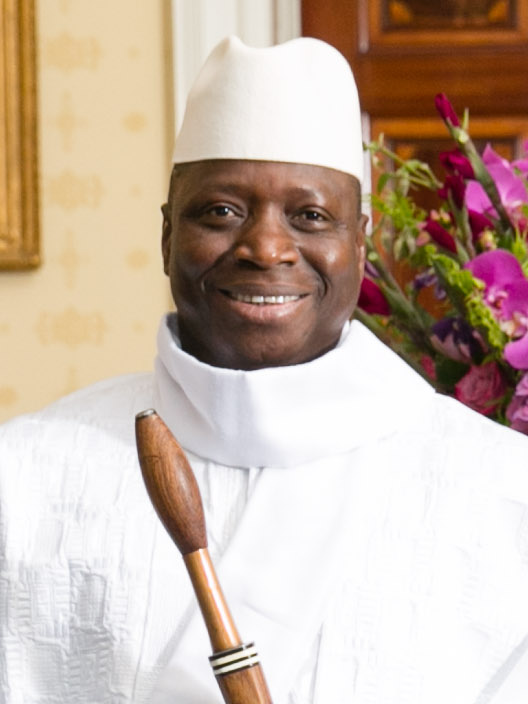

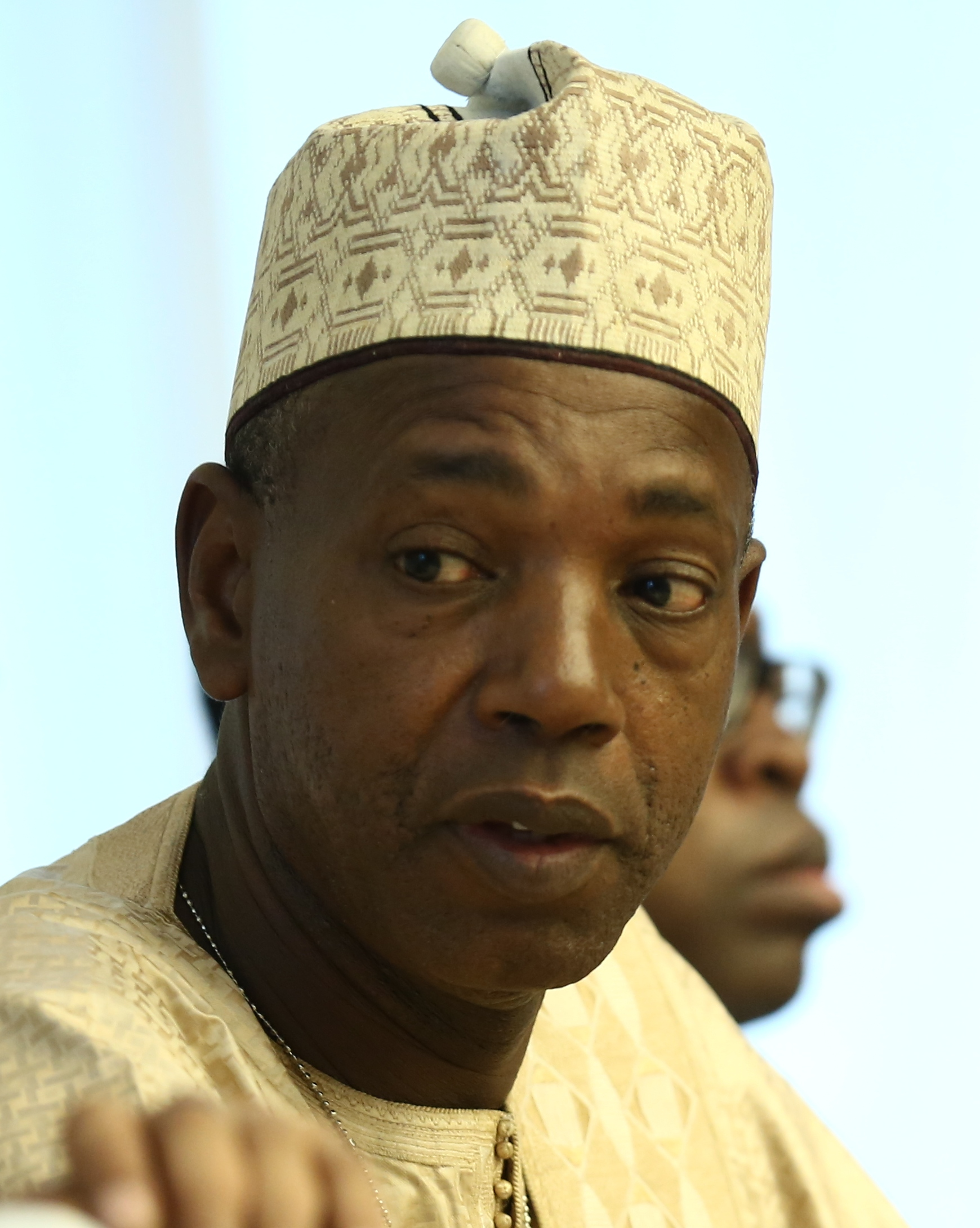
Nominee	Yahya Jammeh	Ousainou Darboe	Hamat Bah
Party	APRC	UDP	United Front
Popular vote	470,550	114,177	73,060
Percentage	71.5%	17.4%	11.1%
President before election
Yahya Jammeh
APRC
Elected President
Yahya Jammeh
APRC

Presidential elections were held in the Gambia on 24 November 2011. Incumbent President Yahya Jammeh, in office since seizing power in a 1994 coup, faced Ousainou Darboe of the United Democratic Party and Hamat Bah of the National Alliance for Democracy and Development.

The elections were won by Jammeh, who received 72% of the vote on an 83% turnout.

== Electoral system ==
Voting took place using marbles dropped into coloured containers each containing a gong.

== Conduct ==
The elections were monitored by the African Union who praised the process, European Union, Organisation of Islamic Cooperation and Commonwealth. The Economic Community of West African States (ECOWAS) did not send any monitors because of "an unacceptable level of control of the electronic media by the party in power... and an opposition and electorate cowed by repression and intimidation".

Before the elections Jammeh had claimed "I will never compromise peace and stability at the altar of so-called democracy", that "there is no way I can lose unless you tell me that all Gambian people are mad" and in response to press criticism said "The journalists are less than 1% of the population and if anybody expects me to allow less than 1% of the population to destroy 99% of the population, you are in the wrong place."

On the election day Bah claimed that he had not heard of any intimidation of his supporters although Darboe claimed the vote was fraudulent, rejected the result and complained of intimidation from the presence of military vehicles on the streets. The Independent Electoral Commission also said there was no intimidation and that "it is impossible to rig elections in Gambia".

There was also criticism of the election organisation as many voters went to the wrong polling station.

== Results ==
Candidate	Party	Votes	%
Yahya Jammeh	Alliance for Patriotic Reorientation and Construction	470,550	71.54
Ousainou Darboe	United Democratic Party	114,177	17.36
Hamat Bah	United Front	73,060	11.11
Total		657,787	100.00
Valid votes		657,787	99.98
Invalid/blank votes		117	0.02
Total votes		657,904	100.00
Registered voters/turnout		796,929	82.55
Source: IEC
