= National Agency Against Trafficking in Persons =

Gambian government agency

The National Agency Against Trafficking in Persons (NAATIP) is a Gambian government agency responsible for combating human trafficking and forced labor.

== History ==
NAATIP was established in 2007 by a resolution of the National Assembly of the Gambia and operates under the Ministry of Justice. It officially began operations on December 1, 2011.

Human trafficking is considered a significant issue in Gambia. According to Director Jawara-Ceesay, Gambia serves as a source country for human trafficking, with Gambians being forced into labor abroad. It is also a transit and destination country for trafficking victims forced into labor within Gambia. Women, girls, and, to some extent, boys are forced into sex work and various forms of forced labor. Victims face stigma and have limited access to support services.

A 2020 report by the United States Department of State noted that, despite efforts, the Gambian government did not fully meet the minimum standards for combating human trafficking. In response, President Adama Barrow ordered an increase in staffing and enhanced border enforcement.

In 2015, a person was convicted of trafficking 19 Gambian girls. As of mid-2021, NAATIP reported that 15 human trafficking cases were being prosecuted in Gambian courts.

== Objectives ==
NAATIP's primary objectives include raising awareness, providing training, and educating the Gambian population on human trafficking. The agency also trains police, security personnel, and border officials on handling human trafficking cases.

NAATIP collaborates with anti-trafficking organizations in neighboring countries, such as the National Agency for the Prohibition of Traffic in Persons and Other Related Matters (NAPTIP) in Nigeria.

== Leadership ==
- Founding director: Landing Kinteh
- Executive director: Tulai Jawara Ceesay
