= Philip Beale (postal historian) =

British historian (1925–2024)

Philip Ormrod Beale FRPSL (21 May 1925 – 16 April 2024) was a British postal historian and former teacher who wrote a number of books on the history of the British postal system and the postal history of West Africa.

== Early life ==
Born in China to Missionary parents who subsequently returned to the UK, Philip Beale grew up in Yorkshire and received his advanced education at Magdalene College, Cambridge, where he read history, graduating in 1946. Whilst at Cambridge University he met his future wife, Barbara, to whom he was married for almost 70 years (1951–2020). Barbara accompanied him to The Gambia where she taught at the High School, of which Beale was the Principal, from 1961 to 1966. Beale and his wife had a strong and enduring Christian Faith and were regular attendees at their local Methodist Church wherever they lived during their marriage.

== Career ==
In 1961, Beale travelled to The Gambia where he was principal of The Gambia High School until 1966. While there he jointly organised an archaeological expedition to examine the Senegambian stone circles, the records of which are in the Royal Anthropological Institute as MS 465. He later lectured on the running of secondary schools.

== Philately ==
Beale joined the Royal Philatelic Society London in 1968, subsequently becoming a fellow of the society. He is a specialist in the postal history of West Africa and has written a number of books relating to that area and the history of the British postal system. His The Postal Service of Sierra Leone: Its history, stamps and stationery until 1961, published by the Royal society in 1988, was described as a "work of distinguished historical scholarship". His History of the Post in England (1998) was reprinted in a new edition as England's Mail in 2005. In 2011 he collaborated with Adrian Almond and Mike Scott-Archer to produce The Corsini Letters, an authoritative account of the cache of around 3,600 letters sent to two Italian merchants in London between 1567 and 1602 that provides insights into postal arrangements at that time.

== Personal life and death ==
Philip Beale was a committed Christian and Methodist Lay Preacher and was happily married to his wife, Barbara from 1951 until her death, in January 2019. Beale survived his wife by five years and died, peacefully, at the age of 98 in a Care Home in Eastbourne, UK on 16 April 2024. Beale and his wife did not have children of their own and he is survived by his sister in law, his niece and his nephew, along with their families.

== Selected publications ==
- The agents of the General Post Office in Fernando Po, Lagos, Madeira, Teneriffe, St. Vincent (Cape Verde Isles) and Freetown during the nineteenth century. British West Africa Study Circle, 1974. (2nd edition, 2008)
- The Postal Service of Sierra Leone: Its history, stamps and stationery until 1961. Royal Philatelic Society, London, 1988. ISBN 0900631163
- Hendy, John G. Ship Letters. Postal History Society, East Grinstead, 1997. (Editor) ISBN 0853770263
- A History of the Post in England from the Romans to the Stuarts. Ashgate, Aldershot, 1998. ISBN 1859284043 (revised as England's Mail, 2005)
- West African GPO Postal Notices of the Nineteenth Century. West Africa Study Circle, 2001. (With Frank Walton) ISBN 978-0953747412
- West African Post Office Impression Books. West Africa Study Circle, Dronfield, 2001. (With J.J. Martin & Frank Walton) ISBN 0953747433
- England's Mail: Two Millennia of Letter Writing. Tempus, Stroud, 2005. ISBN 9780752434919
- The Corsini Letters. Amberley Publishing, Stroud, 2011. (With Adrian Almond & Mike Scott-Archer) ISBN 978-1445600857
- Magdalene Matters, Issue 38, November 2013 https://www.magd.cam.ac.uk/system/files/2017-08/magdalene_matters_issue_38_0.pdf
