= Hamat Bah =

Gambian politician

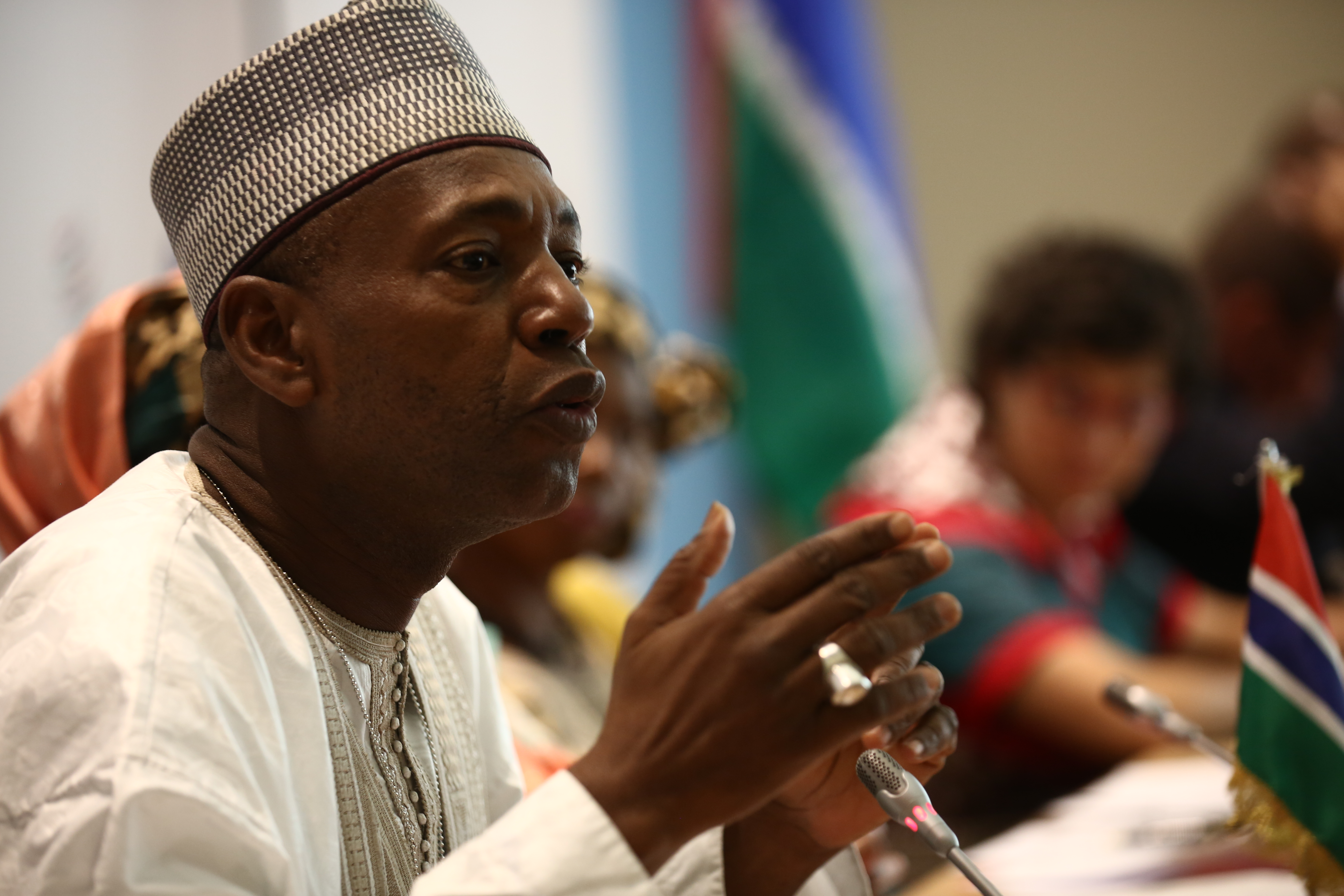

Minister of Tourism and Culture
- Incumbent
- Assumed office 1 February 2017
- President: Adama Barrow
- Preceded by: Benjamin A. Roberts

National Assembly Member for Upper Saloum
- In office 2 January 1997 – June 2005
- Succeeded by: Sainey Mbaye

Leader of the National Reconciliation Party
- Incumbent
- Assumed office 1996
- Preceded by: Position established

Personal details
- Born: Hamat Ngai Kumba Bah Upper Saloum, Central River Division, the Gambia
- Party: National Reconciliation Party
- Other political affiliations: NADD (2005–2006); United Front

Hamat Ngai Kumba Bah is a Gambian politician who is the current Minister of Tourism and Culture in President Adama Barrow's cabinet. He is also the leader of the National Reconciliation Party (NRP) and has been a presidential candidate in 1996, 2001 and 2011. He was the National Assembly Member for Upper Saloum from 1997 to 2005.

== Early life ==
Bah was born in Upper Saloum in the Central River Division. He worked as a teacher at the Gambia College before becoming a manager at Novotel Hotel in Kotu Strand.

== Political career ==
Bah entered politics in 1996 when he stood as the newly-formed National Reconciliation Party's (NRP) candidate in the first president election since Yahya Jammeh's coup d'état in 1994. He came third with 5.5% of the vote. In the 1997 parliamentary election, Bah was one of two NRP candidates to win seats, making them the third largest party. Bah, specifically, won the seat of Upper Saloum with 56.2% of the vote. He became a leading critic of the ruling Alliance for Patriotic Reorientation and Construction (APRC) in the National Assembly thereafter. In 2001, he contested the presidential election as the NRP's candidate, coming third with 7.8% of the vote. In the 2002 parliamentary election, he retained his seat of Upper Saloum.

In January 2005, the NRP joined with four other opposition parties to form the National Alliance for Democracy and Development (NADD). In June 2005, the Supreme Court of the Gambia ruled that all opposition NAMs had to resign their seats and contest by-elections as they could not belong to two political parties at the same time. In the September 2005 by-election that followed, Bah lost his seat to the APRC candidate, Sainey Mbaye. Bah, as well as Halifa Sallah and Omar A. Jallow, was briefly detained in November 2005 on subversion charges, which were dropped the following February. Bah withdrew the NRP from NADD early in 2006 and endorsed the United Democratic Party's (UDP) candidate, Ousainou Darboe, in the 2006 presidential election. Bah also contested Upper Saloum again the 2007 election but again lost to Mbaye.

In 2011, Bah was elected leader of a new opposition alliance, the United Front. As the United Front candidate, in the 2011 presidential election Bah came third with 11% of the vote. After the NRP candidate won the Lower Saloum by-election in 2015, Bah said that result indicated "people's desire for a change in the 2016 election." The NRP was one of several opposition parties that formed Coalition 2016, whose candidate, Adama Barrow, defeated Jammeh in the 2016 presidential election. Speaking following the election, in December 2016, Bah said that one of the coalition's first actions would be to form a commission of inquiry into Jammeh and his regime. On 1 February 2017, Bah was sworn in as Barrow's Minister of Tourism and Culture. He said that his priority would be to "work hard with stakeholders" to develop the tourism, and encouraged members of the press to show that the Gambia "is changing for the better".

Political offices
Preceded by Benjamin A. Roberts	Minister of Tourism and Culture; 2017—present	Incumbent
