= Abubacarr Jah =

Ambassador of The Gambia to Malaysia
- In office 2015–2018
- President: Adama Barrow
- Preceded by: Fatou Mass Jobe-Njie

Deputy Ambassador of The Gambia to the Organisation of Islamic Cooperation
- Incumbent
- Assumed office 2019
- President: Adama Barrow

Personal details
- Education: University of the Gambia

Abubacarr Jah is a Gambian diplomat, who served as the Ambassador of the Islamic Republic of The Gambia to Malaysia and as the Deputy Ambassador of The Gambia to the Organisation of Islamic Cooperation (OIC). He is well known for actively promoting human rights and advocating for justice on the global stage.

== Career ==
Jah's career in the Gambian foreign service began in the early 2000s, where he held various positions in the Ministry of Foreign Affairs. From 2015 to 2018, he served as The Gambia's Ambassador to Malaysia, focusing on enhancing bilateral relations between the two countries in areas such as trade, investment, education, and cultural exchange.

In 2019, Jah was appointed as The Gambia's Deputy Ambassador to the OIC, where he represented the country in several meetings and events. In this role, he advocated for the rights of Muslims worldwide and spoke out on issues related to the OIC, such as the Palestinian and Rohingya crises.

Jah gained attention in April 2021 when he condemned the crimes committed by Armenia in Azerbaijan's territories during a press conference on the visits to Azerbaijan's Aghdam and Ganja by the OIC Contact Group's delegation. He called for justice for the victims, and his statement was widely praised in Azerbaijani media.

== Personal life ==
Jah is a Gambian native with a degree in International Relations from the University of the Gambia. He is married with children.
