= Momodou Lamin Sedat Jobe =

Gambian diplomat (1944–2025)

Momodou Lamin Sedat Jobe (24 July 1944 – 6 April 2025) was a Gambian diplomat who was the Gambian Foreign Minister from 1998 to August 2001. He lived in self-imposed exile in Sweden and was heading the pro-democracy Gambia Consultative Council, which was established in 2013.

== Early life and education ==
Sedat Jobe was born in Bansang, Gambia on 24 July 1944. He completed his higher education in France, finishing with a doctorate from the University of Grenoble in 1976.

== Career ==
When he was not working as a career diplomat, he taught at the University of Dakar from 1974 to 1978 and Howard University from 1978 to 1980. He also worked for UNESCO latterly as its director of culture (1981–1996, 1996–1997).

Jobe returned to the Gambian diplomatic service as an ambassador at large between 1996 and 1998 and was appointed secretary of state for external affairs in January 1998. As foreign minister, Jobe tried to lead an unsuccessful delegation to Guinea-Bissau to try to negotiate a settlement to the country's civil war that erupted in 1998. He resigned in August 2001, following the expulsion of the deputy British high commissioner, Bharat Joshi.

He supported President Yahya Jammeh in the 2006 presidential election but later turned against him. In January 2013, he called for the military to overthrow Jammeh by force, while also strongly criticizing Mai Fatty, the leader of the Gambia Moral Congress.

== Death ==
Jobe died in Dakar on 6 April 2025, at the age of 80.

Preceded by Omar Njie	Foreign Minister of Gambia; 1998–2001	Succeeded by Baboucarr-Blaise Jagne
