= Landing Kinteh =

Gambian lawyer

Landing Kinteh is a Gambian lawyer who has been the Inspector General of Police in the Gambia since 2017.

== Education ==
Kinteh has a bachelor's degree in law from Usmanu Danfodiyo University, Nigeria, and a master's degree in human rights and criminal law from the University of Essex, United Kingdom.

== Career ==
Kinteh is a barrister and solicitor of the Supreme Court of the Gambia. He was the Commissioner of Prosecutions at the Gambian Police Force from 2007 to 2017. In this capacity, he has worked in Darfur, Sudan, for the United Nations (UN). He has also served on secondment as Director of the National Anti-Trafficking in Person (NAATIP) branch of the Ministry of Justice. He was appointed Inspector General of Police on 22 June 2017, replacing Yankuba Sonko.
