= John Sacher =

British businessman (1940–2016)

John Sacher

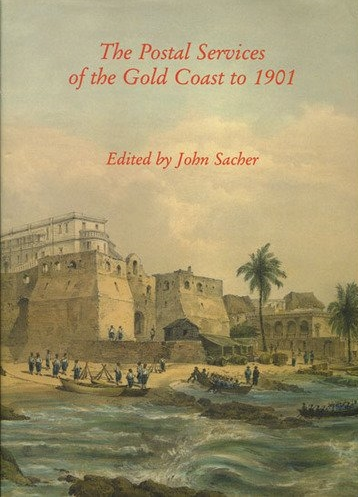
Cover of The postal services of the Gold Coast to 1901 (2003) featuring a print published in 1874 titled Cape Coast Castle – Zouaves embarking for Sierra Leone.

Simon John Sacher, CBE (9 June 1940 – 30 August 2016) was a British retailer who spent thirty years with Marks & Spencer, including 25 years as a director. He was the last descendant of the co-founder of the company, Michael Marks, to serve in an executive capacity on the board of the firm. He was a former president of the Royal Philatelic Society London, member of the Council of the Royal College of Music, a governor of the Hebrew University of Jerusalem, one of its vice-presidents, and vice-president of the Industry and Parliament Trust. He was chairman of the Westminster Forum, and founder of the Whitehall and Industry Group.

== Early life ==
Simon John Sacher was born on 9 June 1940. He was the great grandson of Michael Marks, one of the founders of Marks & Spencer. He received his advanced education at Oxford University from where he graduated with a degree in law.

== Career ==
After university, Sacher joined the merchant bankers Samuel Montagu but left fairly soon for the retailers Marks & Spencer where he spent thirty years, including 25 years as a director. In 1993, he was reported by The Times to have made a profit of more than £1m from the sale of Marks & Spencer shares through its share option scheme. In 1999, Sacher was one of three directors of the firm made redundant following poor trading results in a shake-up instigated by the new chief executive Peter Salsbury. Sacher was in charge of information technology and logistics at the time and the last remaining executive director to descended from a founder of the company. David Sieff, a non-executive director and also a descendant of Michael Marks, remained on the board.

Sacher regularly appeared in the letters pages of The Times. In 1976 he wrote to the editor from 12 Bourne Street SW1 to complain about the high levels of taxation then applicable, which could reach 85%, which he argued were a disincentive to work in the United Kingdom and therefore might damage the pool of management talent available to British industry. In 1988, he wrote to comment on the shortcomings of the jury system and judge's instructions to jurors, having recently served on a jury. In 1994, he wrote objecting to plans to force companies to invest more of their pension funds in gilts rather than equities which he felt would cost more in the end and be unnecessarily cautious in the case of companies with a strong trading performance.

== Philately ==
An enthusiastic philatelist, Sacher joined the Royal Philatelic Society London in March 1966, became a fellow in 1977, and was president from 2007 to 2009. At the time of his death he had recently completed 50 years membership and was one of only 20 people worldwide at that time to have done so. He was also a member of the Collectors Club of New York, the US Philatelic Classics Society, the West Africa Study Circle (and a former President), the Postal History Society, the France & Colonies Philatelic Society, and the International Society for Portuguese Philately.

He was a specialist in West African postal history up to 1900 about which he produced two books, winning the Crawford Medal in 1993 for his book on British Nigeria. Items from his collection were sold at auction by Spink & Son in 2009.

== Appointments ==
Sacher was a fellow, and formerly a member of the Council, of the Royal College of Music. He was a governor of the Hebrew University of Jerusalem, one of its vice-presidents, and the recipient of an honorary PhD from the university. He was vice-president of the Industry and Parliament Trust, chairman of the Westminster Forum, and founder of the Whitehall and Industry Group. In 1998/99 he chaired a working group for the OECD on the implications of the development of the internet for governments and regulation.

Sacher was appointed Commander of the Most Excellent Order of the British Empire (CBE) in 1993 for services to industry.

== Death ==
Sacher died on 30 August 2016. He was survived by his wife Buffy to whom he had been married for over 40 years.

== Selected publications ==
- The postal services of the British Nigeria Region prior to 1914: Including the British consular post office in Fernando Po. Royal Philatelic Society London, London, 1992. (with Jack Ince) ISBN 9780900631252
- The postal services of the Gold Coast to 1901. Royal Philatelic Society London, London, 2003. (Editor) ISBN 978-0900631528
- The Oil Rivers and Niger Coast surcharged provisionals and bisected stamps. Supplement to The London Philatelist, 2009.
