= Ebrima Mballow =

Gambian banker, diplomat and politician (died 2023)

Minister of the Interior
- In office 8 January 2018 – 22 August 2019
- Preceded by: Habib Saihou Drammeh
- Succeeded by: Yankuba Sonko

Governor of West Coast Division
- In office 2017–2018
- Preceded by: Aminata Sifai Hydara
- Succeeded by: Bakary Sanyang

Personal details
- Born: Mansajang Kunda, Upper River Division, Gambia
- Died: 19 February 2023 Saudi Arabia
- Occupation: Banker; Diplomat

Ebrima M. Mballow (died 19 February 2023) was a Gambian banker, diplomat, and politician. He served as Minister of the Interior from 2018 to 2019.

Mballow died in Saudi Arabia on 19 February 2023.
