= West Africa Study Circle =

The West Africa Study Circle (WASC) is the "international specialist society for the study of stamps, postal stationery and postal history of West Africa."

The principal areas covered by the society are the philately of:

- Ascension Island
- Cameroon/Cameroun
- The Gambia
- Gold Coast/Ghana
- The Nigerias: Lagos, Oil Rivers, Niger Coast, Northern Nigeria, Southern Nigeria, Nigeria and Biafra
- St. Helena
- Sierra Leone
- Togo
- Tristan da Cunha/Gough Island
- British Postal Agencies on Madeira, Tenerife, St Vincent (Cape Verde Islands) and Fernando Po.

Themes covered include:

- Airmails
- Censorship
- Maritime mail
- Military campaigns
- Postal cancellations and postmarks
- Postal services
- Stamps

within or with connections to West Africa.

WASC is affiliated to the Association of British Philatelic Societies (ABPS) and the American Philatelic Society (APS).

== Meetings ==
The Study Circle meets every March and November in person at the Royal Philatelic Society London's premises and every June at Salisbury. In person meetings are also held in Nigeria and elsewhere, supplemented by quarterly online meetings which attract members from all over the world.

A weekend conference is held every second year (2025, 2027 etc.) in the UK, whch allows members to display aspects of West African philately in convivial settings.

== Cameo Journal ==
The journal of the West Africa Study Circle has been published since 1975. Cameo appears three times a year, usually in January, June and October. Printed in color, it is in A4 format, with a wide range of articles and comment. There are sections reviewing recently published literature, auction reports and display summaries, as well as in-depth articles of philatelic research. The journal has been awarded gold medals at national and international philatelic competitions. Mailed with Cameo are the Secretary's newsletter (giving details of meetings and other society news), WASC auction catalogues and publication flyers. All distributions are electronic and, if a member chooses, in printed form.

== Auctions ==
Postal auctions are held twice a year, allowing members the opportunity to buy and sell West African materilas at low rates of commission. The biannual conference has a live auction, Each auction comprises several hundred lots with reasonable estimate. Membership of the WASC is required to buy in the auctions.

== Publications ==
The Study Circle actively publishes West African philatelic literature, ranging from handbooks on major subjects to monographs on specialized topics.

All WASC publications are available to members of the Study Circle at a discount for pre-publication orders.

Several of the society's recent publications have received significant awards in national and international competitions.

== Online documents ==
Numerous documents are available for free download from the WASC website. These concern airmail, postmarks and maritime matters, as well as a large section of Post Office reports and similar from Nigeria.

All issues of Cameo before the most recent ones are also available for download. This covers over 100 issues starting in January 1975.

A programme of digitization of more philatelic records and archives is being undertaken.

== See also ==
- Philip O. Beale
- John Sacher
- Frank Walton
