= Elizabeth Ya Eli Harding =

- Born: March 23, 1956 (age 70)
- Education: Glasgow Caledonian University
- Occupation: Diplomat

Elizabeth Ya Eli Harding (born 23 March 1956) was the High Commissioner of The Gambia to the United Kingdom from 2007 to 2013, then the first Ambassador of The Gambia to the United Kingdom from 2013 to 2017, when she was replaced by Francis Blain.

== Early life ==
Harding was born on 23 March 1956, and educated at high school in Banjul, followed by sponsorship from the Commonwealth to attend a diplomatic program in French, and then studies in Scotland and Canada. She earned a master's degree from Glasgow Caledonian University.

== Career ==
Harding had been the Gambian High Commissioner to the United Kingdom from 20 August 2007 to 2013.

From 2013, Harding was the Ambassador to the United Kingdom, until she was recalled in 2017. She has since been replaced by Francis Blain.

In December 2014, a "gang of Gambian diplomats" were found guilty at Southwark Crown Court of running a "tax-free tobacconist" from embassy premises in London for three years, and avoiding £5 million of tax. Seven people including the Deputy Head of the Gambian Diplomatic Mission, Yusupha Bojang, were found guilty. They had ordered 32 tonnes of tax-free rolling tobacco, and abused a scheme that provided a duty-free tax exemption on goods for personal use, even though none of them actually smoked. Harding appeared at the hearing, but was not a defendant, and said that she had used the scheme to buy perfume and rice, but had never talked about it with her staff, and only became aware of the abuse of diplomatic privilege after she was written to by the UK's Foreign & Commonwealth Office.

In December 2016, 11 ambassadors including Harding wrote a collective letter to The Gambia's then President, Yahya Jammeh, who had lost the 1 December election, but was refusing to accept defeat, to accept the result and stand down peacefully. In January 2017, Jammeh dismissed 12 ambassadors including Harding. In February 2017, Gambia's new President, Adama Barrow, reinstated the dismissed ambassadors.

== Honours ==
Harding is a member of the Order of the Republic of The Gambia.

== Personal life ==
Harding is married, with four children.

== See also ==
- High Commissioner of the Gambia to the United Kingdom
