= Amie Bojang-Sissoho =

Gambian women's rights activist and politician

Amie Bajang Sissoho
- Education: Bachelor degree in media and cultural studies from the university of Southampton, United Kingdom.
- Occupation(s): Gambia journalist, women's rights activist and politician
- Known for: Gambia first women government director of press and public relations
- Notable work: Manager of the presidential campaign of Isatou Touray in 2016 Gambia presidential election
- Parents: Imam Hatab Bojanng (father); Ya Khan Jobe (mother)

Amie Bojang-Sissoho is a Gambian journalist, women's rights activist and politician. She emerged Gambian first woman government's Director of Press and Public Relation following her appointment by president Adama Barrow.

== Background and education ==
Bojang-Sissoho was born in Gunjur. Her father was Imam Hatab Bojang (1937-1984) and her mother was Ya Khan Jobe. Bojang-Sissoho studied for a bachelor's degree in Media and Cultural Studies at the University of Southampton, United Kingdom.

== Career ==
She began her professional career with the Gambia Radio & Television Service (GRTS) and worked there for a long time. She was the manager of the presidential campaign of Isatou Touray in the 2016 Gambian presidential election until Touray withdrew his candidacy to support Adama Baroow, who went on to win the election. After taking power, Barrow named her government's Director of Press and Public Relation. Bojang-Sissoho is a Programme Coordinator of the Gambia Committee for Traditional Practices (GAMCOTRAP). she was arrested along with Touray, on 11 October 2010, on charges of embezzlement of 30,000 euros and imprisoned in Mile 2 prison but were cleared of all charges against by the court.
