= Ousman Rambo Jatta =

Ousman Rambo Jatta (born 13 June 1969), known as Rambo, is a Gambian politician. He is currently a councillor in Old Bakau and deputy leader of the Alliance for Patriotic Reorientation and Construction (APRC).

== Political career ==
Jatta was a member of the United Democratic Party (UDP). In 2006, he protested against suspected misconduct in the Gambian presidential election. He claimed that a group of people travelling in army vehicles on their way to vote were, instead of Gambian soldiers, non-Gambians dressed in military uniforms. As a result of this allegation, Jatta was arrested on 23 September. He was defended by UDP party leader and human rights lawyer Ousainou Darboe. Jatta was held in prison for a year. According to Amnesty International, he was held under unspecified national security charges. He was released on 19 October 2007 and told Reuters that he was happy to be back with his family and thanked God for his release.

In 2008, Jatta was elected as a councillor in Old Bakau. He joined Yahya Jammeh's ARPC party in 2011. He became deputy leader of the ARPC in June 2018 after the dismissal of Momodou Alieu Bah.
