= Susan Waffa-Ogoo =

Gambian politician

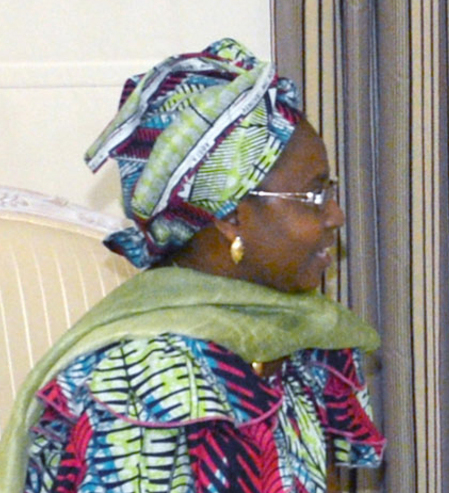

Minister of Foreign Affairs of the Gambia
- In office November 2012 – October 2013
- President: Yahya Jammeh
- Preceded by: Mamadou Tangara
- Succeeded by: Aboubacar Senghore

Personal details
- Born: 4 October 1960 (age 65) Serekunda, Gambia
- Party: APRC

Susan Waffa-Ogoo (born 4 October 1960) is a Gambian politician who served as the country's Minister of Foreign Affairs from November 2012 to October 2013. A librarian before entering politics, she was first appointed to cabinet after the 1994 coup d'état and held a number of ministerial posts under President Yahya Jammeh. She also served as the Gambia's Permanent Representative to the United Nations from 2008 to 2012.

== Early life ==
Waffa-Ogoo was born in Serekunda, into an Aku family. She attended St. Joseph's High School, and then began working as a library assistant at Yundum College. Waffa-Ogoo later completed further study overseas, receiving a certificate in library and information studies from the University of Ghana and then completing a Bachelor of Arts in the same field from England's Loughborough University. While in England, she was employed in the library of the School of Oriental and African Studies. On her return to the Gambia, she became deputy librarian at Gambia College, as well as a part-time lecturer.

== Politics ==
Following the 1994 coup d'état, Waffa-Ogoo was appointed Minister of Information and Tourism in the new government formed by Yahya Jammeh. She was one of only two women in cabinet, along with Fatoumata Tambajang (the Minister of Health). She and Jammeh had known each other as children, with some sources describing her as his "adopted sister". Waffa-Ogoo's title was changed to Minister of Tourism and Culture in 1996, and following a ministerial reshuffle in August 2000 she was instead made Minister for Fisheries, Natural Resources, and the Environment. She returned to the tourism and culture portfolio in September 2004, but in February 2006 was removed from the cabinet entirely and replaced by Angela Colley (a former student of hers). Waffa-Ogoo returned to the cabinet in October 2006, as Minister for Trade, Industry, and Employment, but was again dismissed in February 2007.

In April 2008, Waffa-Ogoo was appointed the Gambia's Permanent Representative to the United Nations. She had initially been appointed High Commissioner to India, but did not take up that appointment before being nominated to the other position. In November 2012, Waffa-Ogoo left her UN position in order to be re-appointed to cabinet as Minister of Foreign Affairs. She was the first woman to hold the position. However, she served for less than a year before being removed, reputedly after Jammeh disapproved of her handling of a conflict with the U.S. Department of State.

== See also ==
- List of female foreign ministers
