= Ousman Jammeh =

Gambian politician

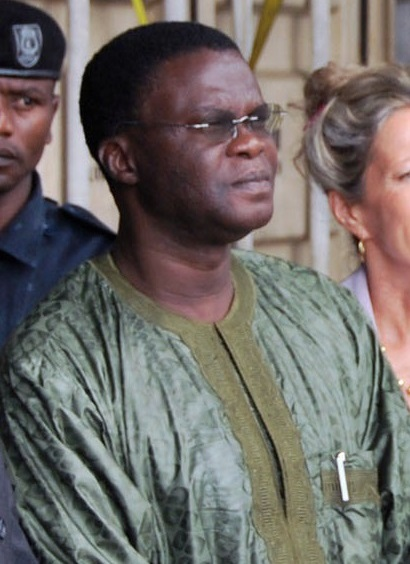

Minister of Energy
- In office 2010–2011
- Preceded by: Sira Wally Ndow-Njie
- In office May 2008 – September 2009

Minister of Foreign Affairs
- In office September 2009 – June 2010
- Preceded by: Omar Touray
- Succeeded by: Mamadou Tangara

Personal details
- Born: 13 August 1953 (age 73)
- Education: University of Nigeria, Nsukka; University of East Anglia (MA)

Ousaman Jammeh (born 13 August 1953) is a Gambian politician.

He was educated at the University of Nigeria, Nsukka, at the Finafrica Institute in Milan and the University of East Anglia (MA Rural Development, 1984). He held the post of Gambian Foreign Minister from September 2009 to June 2010, having previously held the post of Energy Minister from May 2008 to September 2009. Redeployed as Energy Minister in June 2010, he also served as Secretary General and Head of the Civil Service in 2011.

He was national chairperson of the National Unity Party (NUP).
