= Aji Secka =

Gambian politician

Aji Yam Secka
- Born: Ajaratou Mariama (Yamu) Secka
- Other name: Mariama B. Secka
- Citizenship: Gambia
- Occupation: Politician
- Years active: 1998–present
- Known for: Leadership role in the United Democratic Party and opposition alliance during the 2016 Gambian presidential election
- Office: Deputy Leader of the United Democratic Party (UDP)
- Political party: United Democratic Party (UDP)

Aji Yam Secka (Ajaratou Mariama (Yamu) Secka; also known as Mariama B. Secka) is a Gambian politician who was deputy leader of the United Democratic Party (UDP) and a longtime women leader acting in various capacities.

== Career ==
From 1998 to 2001, she was Secretary General of the party's women. She was deputy director of UND from 2011 to 2018. Secka became the head of the party in 2016 when the leader of the party, Ousainou Darboe, was held in detention by the government. Secka was one of the opposition leaders who formed a political alliance that endorsed the candidacy of Adama Barrow who eventually defeated the incumbent President Yahya Jammeh.
