= Modou Bamba Gaye =

Gambian politician

Modou Bamba Gaye is a Gambian politician who served as the National Assembly Member for Lower Saloum, representing the National Reconciliation Party (NRP), from a 2015 by-election until the 2017 parliamentary election.

== Political career ==
Gaye was elected in a 2015 by-election for the Lower Saloum seat, following the dismissal of incumbent NAM Pa Malick Ceesay from the ruling Alliance for Patriotic Reorientation and Construction (APRC). Gaye defeated APRC candidate Kebba Touray in the election, winning 2764 votes to Touray's 1618 votes. Speaking in the National Assembly in January 2017, during the constitutional crisis and Yahya Jammeh's refusal to step down, Gaye called for a peaceful transition of power and said, "The people who voted us in are the same people who voted for Jammeh before and are the same people who voted Adama Barrow."
