= Ousman Sonko =

Gambian politician

Minister of the Interior
- In office 23 October 2006 – 19 September 2016
- President: Yahya Jammeh
- Succeeded by: Momodou Alieu Bah

Personal details
- Born: 9 January 1969 (age 57) Serekunda, The Gambia

Ousman Sonko (born 9 January 1969) is a former Gambian politician. He served as Interior Minister between 2006 and 2016 under the Gambian dictator Yahya Jammeh. During this period he is suspected of taking part in acts of torture, including in detention centers.

== Early life ==
Sonko was born in Serekunda on 9 January 1969.

== Military career ==
Sonko had a career in the military, starting in 1988. In early 2000 he served as commander of the State Guards Battalion. He later served as Inspector General of The Gambia Police Force before being appointed to Interior Minister. He was appointed as Interior Minister on 23 October 2006. On 19 September 2016 Sonko was replaced as Interior Minister by Momodou Alieu Bah.

== Exile in Europe ==
In September 2016 Sonko fled to Sweden, applying for residency on 21 September.

=== Legal case ===
On 26 January 2017 Sonko was arrested in Switzerland, where he had been reportedly living since November 2016, after his request in Sweden had been denied. Sonko was arrested after the rights group TRIAL International filed a complaint against him on the basis of human rights violations. At the time of his arrest he was living in a center for asylum seekers. He was detained to investigate the allegations, initially for three months, and for another three months in May 2017. In November 2019 his detention was extended by the Federal Criminal Court of Switzerland until late January 2020. As of May 2020 he was still in custody.

On 18 April 2023, the Swiss Attorney General declared that Sonko had been charged with crimes against humanity under the principle of universal jurisdiction. He was accused of "having supported, participated in and failed to prevent 'systematic and generalised attacks' as part of a repressive campaign by security forces against [former dictator Yahya] Jammeh's opponents". He has also been charged with rape, torture, and murder. His trial at the Federal Criminal Court began on 8 January 2024. On 4 March 2024, the prosecutor requested life imprisonment against Sonko. On 15 May, the Swiss criminal court sentenced Sonko to 20 years in prison for crimes against humanity under Jammeh's regime.
