= Dawda Fadera =

Gambian civil servant (died 2022)

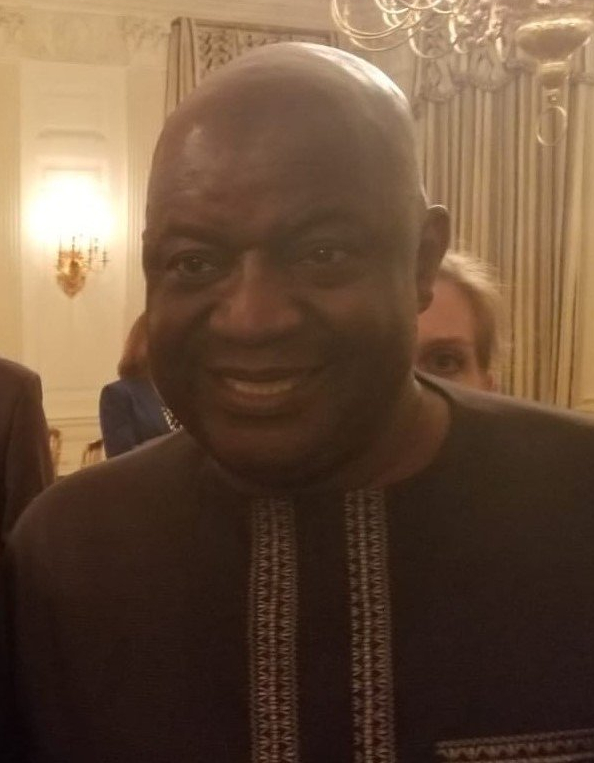
- Fadera in 2019

Gambian Ambassador to the United States
- In office 24 January 2018 – 20 February 2022
- President: Adama Barrow
- Preceded by: Sheikh Omar Faye

Secretary General Head of the Civil Service
- In office 9 February 2017 – 8 January 2018
- President: Adama Barrow
- Succeeded by: Habib Drammeh

Personal details
- Born: Kiang Nema, Lower River Division, Gambia
- Died: 20 February 2022 Banjul, Gambia

Dawda Docka Fadera (died 20 February 2022) was a Gambian diplomat who served as ambassador to the United States from 2018 until his death. Prior to his appointment, he was Secretary General and Head of the Civil Service and Permanent Secretary at the Personnel Management Office (PMO).

== Early life ==
Fadera was born in Kiang Nema in the Lower River Division.

== Civil service career ==
Fadera worked in the Personnel Management Office (PMO), part of the Office of the President, for the bulk of his civil service career, rising to become Permanent Secretary. He joined the PMO during Dawda Jawara's time as President. As Permanent Secretary at the PMO, he chaired the National Records Services and the Management Development Institute and was also the Gambia-based contact for the Commonwealth Fund for Technical Cooperation (CFTC). Fadera was dismissed from the role in July 2011 by Yahya Jammeh but was reinstated in June 2012 after Jammeh found that the PMO began undergoing major difficulties without Fadera's leadership.

In August 2014, Fadera testified in the trial of former Secretary General Njogou Bah. Fadera was detailed in July 2016 alongside several other senior officials, having been accused of corruption in the awarding of a contract to Dubai-based oil company March Petroleum.

He was appointed by President Adama Barrow as Secretary General and Head of the Civil Service on 9 February 2017. He replaced Musa Jallow, whom Yahya Jammeh had appointed to the position on 10 January 2017. Shortly after his appointment, Fadera announced that he would be undertaking reforms to eliminate political interference in the Gambia's civil service.

Fadera presented his credentials as ambassador extraordinary and plenipotentiary to President Donald Trump at the White House on January 24, 2018.

He died in Banjul on 20 February 2022.
