= Rohey John Manjang =

Gambian politician

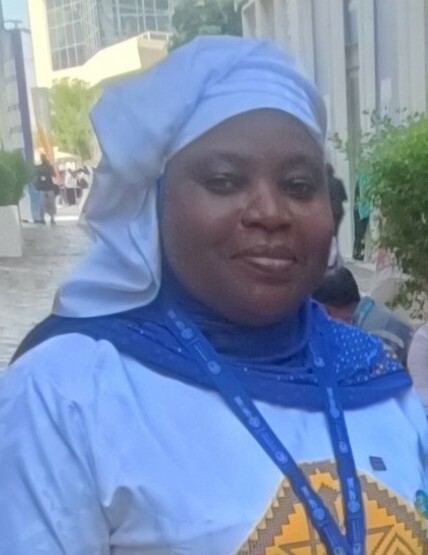
- Manhang at COP28 in Dubai, UAE

Minister of Environment, Climate Change and Natural Resources (MECCNAR) in the Government of The Gambia
- Incumbent
- Assumed office 10 May 2022
- President: Adama Barrow

Rohey John Manjang is a Gambian politician. She is an independent politician and has served as Minister of Environment, Climate Change and Natural Resources (MECCNAR) in the Government of The Gambia since 10 May 2022.

== Biography ==
On 10 May 2022 John Manjang was appointed as Minister of Environment, Climate Change and Natural Resources (MECCNAR) in the Government of The Gambia. Before her appointment to the Cabinet of Adama Barrow, she was Governor of the Lower River Region and was succeeded as Governor by Seedy Lamin Bah.

In September 2023, John Manjang the signed Kampala Ministerial Declaration on Migration, Environment and Climate Change (KDMECC-Africa) at the 2023 Africa Climate Summit in Nairobi, Kenya. She was a United Nations Capital Development Fund (UNCDF) LoCAL Ministerial Ambassador in 2023.

In February 2024, John Manjang "announced the establishment of four indigenous community reserve areas in the Central River Region and the creation of a marine protected area at Kartung." In July 2024, she introduced the project "Restoration of an Ecological Corridor for Forest Biodiversity Conservation and Ecosystem Services to Support Implementation of the Great Green Wall in The Gambia" to implement sustainable land management practices and restore 43,000 hectares of land as forest. In October 2024, John Manjang launched a National Action Plan alongside the organisation Common Seas to tackle plastic pollution and reduce ocean contamination, including a phased ban on single-use plastic bottles and carrier bags. She also raised awareness of the impact of climate change on food security in The Gambia on World Environment Day.

In March 2025, John Manjang signed a Memorandum of Understanding (MoU) with Ghana's Jospong Group of Companies (JGC) to build a waste treatment plant in The Gambia, as only 20% of waste in the country is properly collected and disposed in 2024. In May 2025, John Manjang officially opened the Environment, Climate Change and Natural Resources Ministry's new centralised office complex in Abuko.

In July 2025, John Manjang presented the 2025 National Environmental Management Bill to the National Assembly of The Gambia for its second reading, which would repeal and replace the 1994 National Environment Management Act (NEMA). The Bill was passed for a third reading. After a two-day national workshop in August 2025, the Bill and an accompanying National Climate Change Policy were validated.
