= Gambia Red Cross Society =

- Founded: 1966
- Type: Non-profit organisation
- Purpose: Humanitarian Aid
- Location: Gambia
- Affiliations: International Committee of the Red Cross; International Federation of Red Cross and Red Crescent Societies

Gambia Red Cross Society, also known as GRCS, was founded in 1966. It had begun as a branch of the British Red Cross in 1948. It was officially recognized by the International Committee of the Red Cross in 1974. The organization has its headquarters in Banjul, The Gambia.

Despite being a Muslim majority nation, it uses the Red Cross as its symbol for the society.
