= Benjamin A. Roberts =

Minister of Tourism and Culture
- Incumbent
- Assumed office September 2014

Minister of Finance and Economic Affairs
- Incumbent
- Assumed office January 2017

Personal details
- Education: Missouri Western State University, University of Manchester, National University of Singapore
- Occupation: Politician, Economist

Benjamin A. Roberts is a Gambian politician who has held various government positions, and is presently serving as the Minister of Tourism and Culture in the Republic of The Gambia.

== Education and career ==
Roberts earned a BSBA degree in Economics and Finance from Missouri Western State University, an MA in Industrial Strategy and Trade Policy from the University of Manchester, and an MSc in International Economics from the National University of Singapore. He has worked in different fields such as Investment and Export Promotion, Business Development, Institutional and Corporate Banking, Risk Management, and Credit Risk Analysis. He has gained experience working with the Federal Housing and Loan Mortgage Corporation in the United States, Databank in Ghana, Standard Chartered Bank in The Gambia, and The Gambia Investment & Export Promotion Agency.

Before his appointment as Minister in September 2014, Roberts served as the Director General of The Gambia Tourism Board for 2.5 years.

Roberts was appointed as the Minister of Finance and Economic Affairs by outgoing President Yahya Jammeh in January 2017.

== Controversy ==
Roberts was involved in a controversy in 2017 when he was summoned before the National Assembly standing committee on a public petition over alleged corruption and abuse of office related to his time as Director General of the Gambia Tourism Board. He denied the allegations and stated that the payment of $225,000 to the contractor of a housing complex was demanded by the Ministry of Tourism, and the GTBoard complied.
