= Angela Colley =

Gambian politician

Angela Bernadette Colley (born November 13, 1964) is the Gambian High Commissioner to the Federal Republic of Nigeria.

She is a former Secretary of State for Tourism and Culture. She holds a bachelor's degree in education and worked in the teaching profession for 17 years before joining the Gambian cabinet in 2006. She relinquished the post to Nancy Njie on 19 March 2008, and from then on represented The Gambia as High Commissioner to Nigeria. Previously, Fatou Sinyan Mergan had declined the post.

Political offices
Preceded by Susan Waffa-Ogoo	Secretary of State for Tourism and Culture; 2006–2008	Succeeded by Nancy Seedy Njie
