= Saffie Lowe Ceesay =

Gambian politician and civil servant

Saffie Lowe Ceesay is a Gambian politician and civil servant who was the Minister of Health and Social Welfare in Adama Barrow's cabinet.

== Career ==
Ceesay worked in the Personnel Management Office (PMO) and was a senior personnel officer there in 2003. In 2013, she was deputy permanent secretary at the PMO. In August 2016, Ceesay said she was "delighted" that Zeinab Jammeh's Operation Save the Children Foundation was working with the ministry. Ceesay was the permanent secretary at the Ministry of Health and Social Care. She was arrested by plainclothes policemen on 19 November 2016 and later detained at the National Intelligence Agency (NIA) headquarters. Ceesay was appointed as Minister of Health and Social Welfare by Adama Barrow on 22 February 2017. In a major cabinet reshuffle on 29 June 2018, she left the cabinet, with her future role to be in the Foreign Service.
