= Minister of the Interior (The Gambia) =

Minister of the Interior of the Gambia
- Coat of arms of the Gambia
- Incumbent; Hon. Yankuba Sonko since 22 August 2019
- Appointer: President of the Gambia

The minister of the interior is a cabinet position in the Gambia that oversees the Ministry of the Interior. The ministry is responsible for immigration, visas, the police force, the prison service and registering NGOs.

== List of ministers of the interior ==
- Abdoulie Sulayman Mboob, 1965 – 1987
- Lamin Kitty Jabang, 1987 – 1994
- Sadibou Hydara, 1994 – 27 January 1995
- Lamin Kaba Bajo, 27 January 1995 – 8 March 1997
- Momodou Bojang, 8 March 1997 – 27 January 1999
- Ousman Badjie, 27 January 1999 – 29 September 2003
- Sulayman M. Ceesay, 29 September 2003 – 4 May 2004
- Samba Bah, 4 May 2004 – 29 March 2005
- Baboucarr Jatta, 29 March 2005 – 22 November 2006
- Ousman Sonko, 22 November 2006 – 16 April 2012
- Lamin Kaba Bajo, 16 April 2012 – 7 May 2012
- Ousman Sonko, 7 May 2012 – 19 September 2016
- Momodou Alieu Bah, 19 September 2016 – 18 January 2017
- Mai Ahmed Fatty, 1 February 2017 – 10 November 2017
- Habib Saihou Drammeh, 4 December 2017 – 8 January 2018
- Ebrima M. Mballow, 8 January 2018 – 22 August 2019
- Yankuba Sonko, 22 August 2019 – present
