= Momodou Baboucar Njie =

Gambian politician

Momodou Baboucarr Njie
- Born: Momodou; February 10, 1929; Banjul
- Died: March 3, 2009 (aged 80)
- Other name: Alhaji
- Citizenship: The Gambia
- Occupation: Politician
- Known for: Member of the House of Representatives of Gambia
- Political party: People's Progressive Party
- Children: 8

Alhaji Momodou Baboucarr Njie (February 10, 1929 – March 3, 2009) was a two-term speaker of The Republic of the Gambia, and for the short-lived Senegambia confederation. He was also a founding member of the Gambia Chamber of Commerce and Industry (GCCI), serving as its first president, in addition to serving as a member of the Public Service Commission and of the Banjul Committee of Muslim Elders. He also served as the General Manager of British Petroleum (BP) in the Gambia, from where he gained the nickname 'Njie BP' and later became the Chairman of TotalFinaElf.

He gathered experience in private and public office. On his death on March 3, 2009, he was given a state funeral by Alhajji Dr Yahya A.J.J. Jammeh, President of The Republic of the Gambia. He is survived by 8 children.
