= Sirra Wally Ndow-Njie =

Gambian politician

Minister of Energy
- In office 25 December 2009 – 10 June 2010
- President: Yahya Jammeh

Minister of Petroleum
- In office 16 February 2015 – June 2016

Personal details
- Citizenship: Gambian

Sirra Wally Ndow-Njie (also Ndow Njai) is a Gambian politician. She has served as Minister of Energy, Minister of Petroleum, and Deputy Minister of Tourism and Culture. In June 2016 she was arrested on economic crime charges and detained in prison until the charges were dropped in April 2017.

== Political career ==
Ndow-Njie served on the National Planning Commission in April 2008 and was deputy-director of Gambia's National Water & Electricity Company. From 25 December 2009 to 10 June 2010, she served in the cabinet of Gambian president Yahya Jammeh as Minister of Energy. She was appointed an Officer of the National Order of the Republic of The Gambia in January 2010 in commemoration of the 45th anniversary of independence and 15th anniversary of 1994 Gambian coup d'état.

Ndow-Njie was then reappointed to the cabinet as Minister of Petroleum on 16 February 2015. On 2 April 2010 she met Kim Yong-nam, President of the Presidium of the Supreme People's Assembly of North Korea during a goodwill visit to Gambia.

Ndow-Njie was removed as Petroleum Minister by Jammeh and made Deputy Minister for Tourism and Culture in June 2016.

=== Criminal charges and acquittal ===
On 20 June 2016 she was removed from her ministerial post and charged with economic crimes. It was alleged that Ndow-Njie and nine others within her department and the national petroleum company had "intentionally caused detriment to the economy of The Gambia between 2015 and 2016". Specific charges included making $7 million of payments to March Trading, an allegedly fraudulent petroleum company, and spending 3.5 million dalasis on a trip to visit the company in Dubai.

Ndow-Njie was remanded in custody and denied all bail, in an unusual move supposedly at the request of Jammeh. During this time she was held in Gambia's Mile Two Prison, where she was said to have suffered from a poor diet and low standards of medical care. The prosecution against her and all others accused was dropped in April 2017, coming after the replacement of Jammeh by President Adama Barrow.

== Personal life ==
Ndow-Njie is married to Basiru Njie, a civil servant at the Central Bank of The Gambia.
