= Fatou Lamin Faye =

Gambian politician

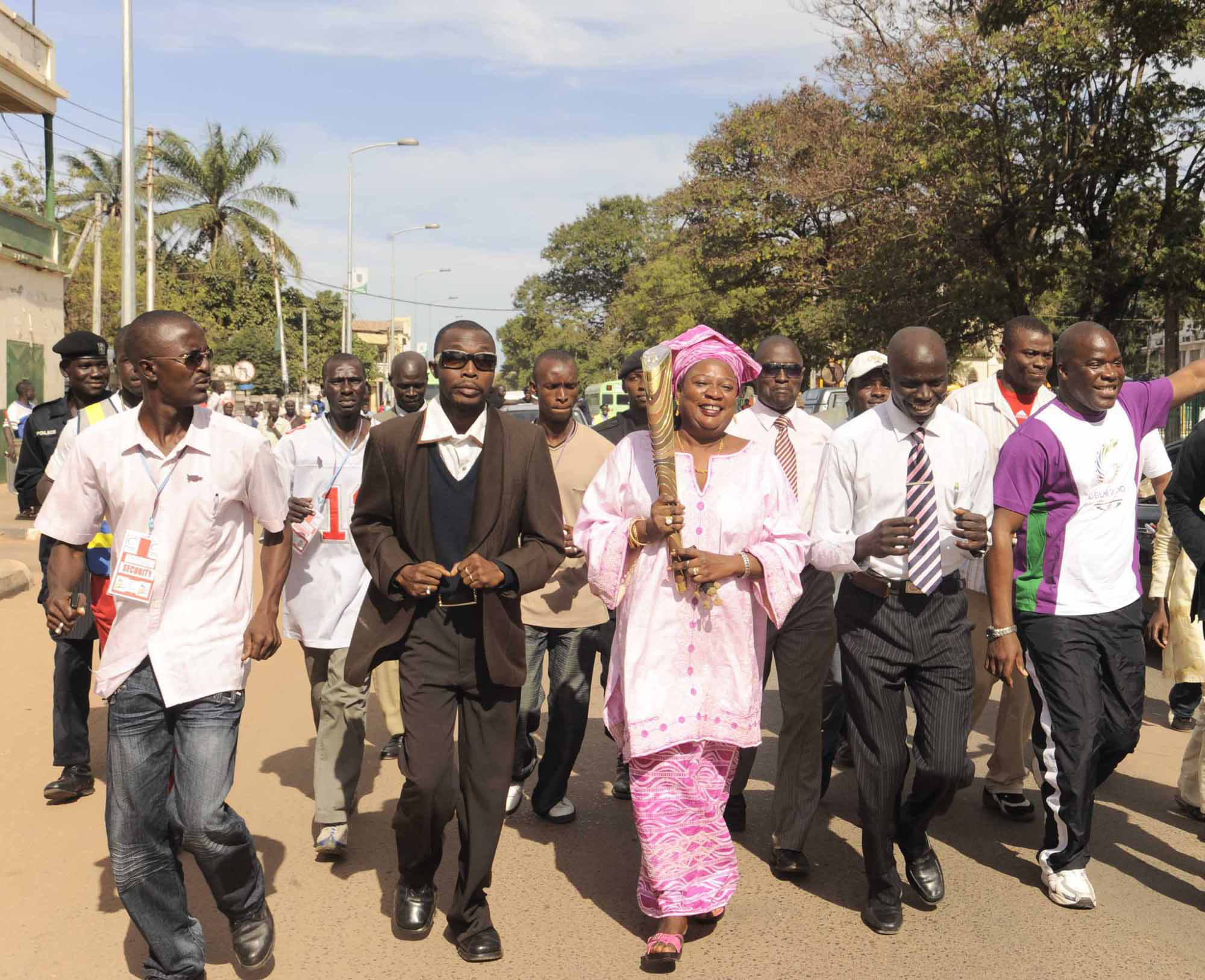
Faye (center) with various government ministers in 2009

Fatou Lamin Faye (born 10 February 1954) is a Gambian politician.

She was educated at Gambia High School, and has diplomas in Agricultural Home Economics from Ahmadu Bello University, Nigeria, and in Social Development from the Coady International Institute at St. Francis Xavier University, Canada; a teaching certificate from Gambia Technical Training Institute; and Bachelor and Master of Education degrees from the University of Huddersfield in West Yorkshire, England.

From 1975 to 2000 with a short break she was a civil servant, initially in the Department of Agriculture and later in the Directorate of Technical Education and Vocational Training. After retiring from the civil service in 2000 she took up a post with TANGO: The Association of NGOs. She was director of the Gambia Technical Training Institute from 2002 to 2004, and was appointed Minister of Basic and Secondary Education in 2004. In September 2016 she was given the portfolio of National Assembly Matters, succeeding Bala Garba Jahumpa in this role.

In 2013 the University of Huddersfield awarded her an honorary degree of Doctor of the University. In the oration for her award it was said: "As the Gambian Minister for Basic and Secondary Education, she has campaigned for increased government spending on education, making clear that good quality basic education is a human right that facilitates economic growth and employment and enhances self-esteem and social justice".
