= Upper Saloum =

Coordinates: 13°45′N 15°12′W

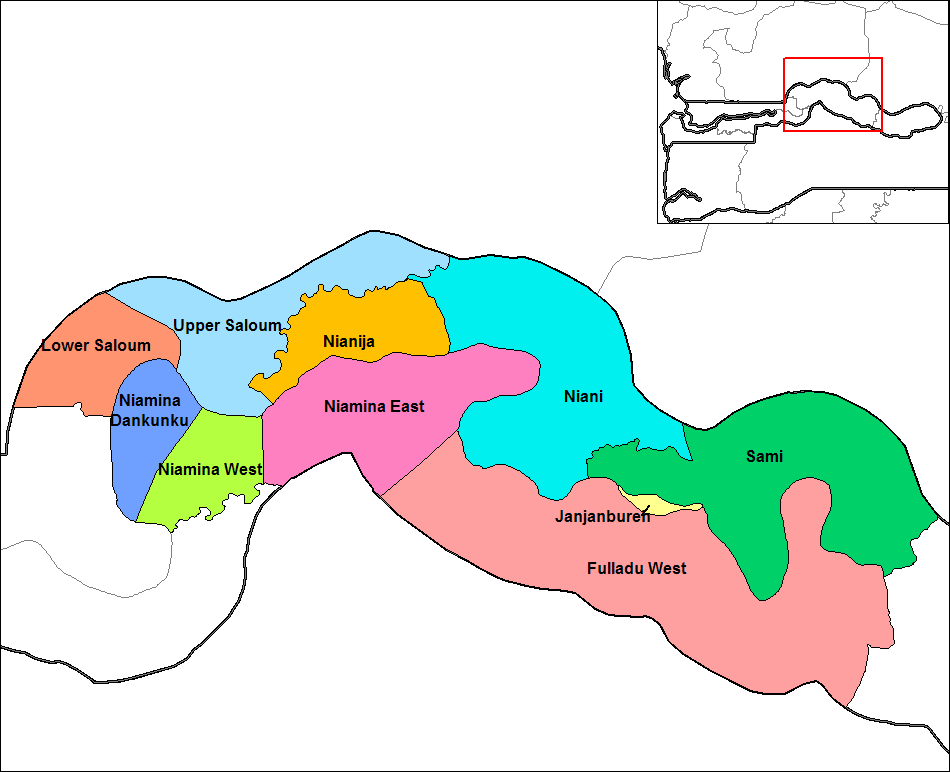
Districts of Central River Division

Upper Saloum is one of the ten districts of the Central River Division of the Gambia. In the 2013 census, it had a population of 19,145.
