= Fafa Sanyang =

Gambian politician

Fafa Sanyang FGS
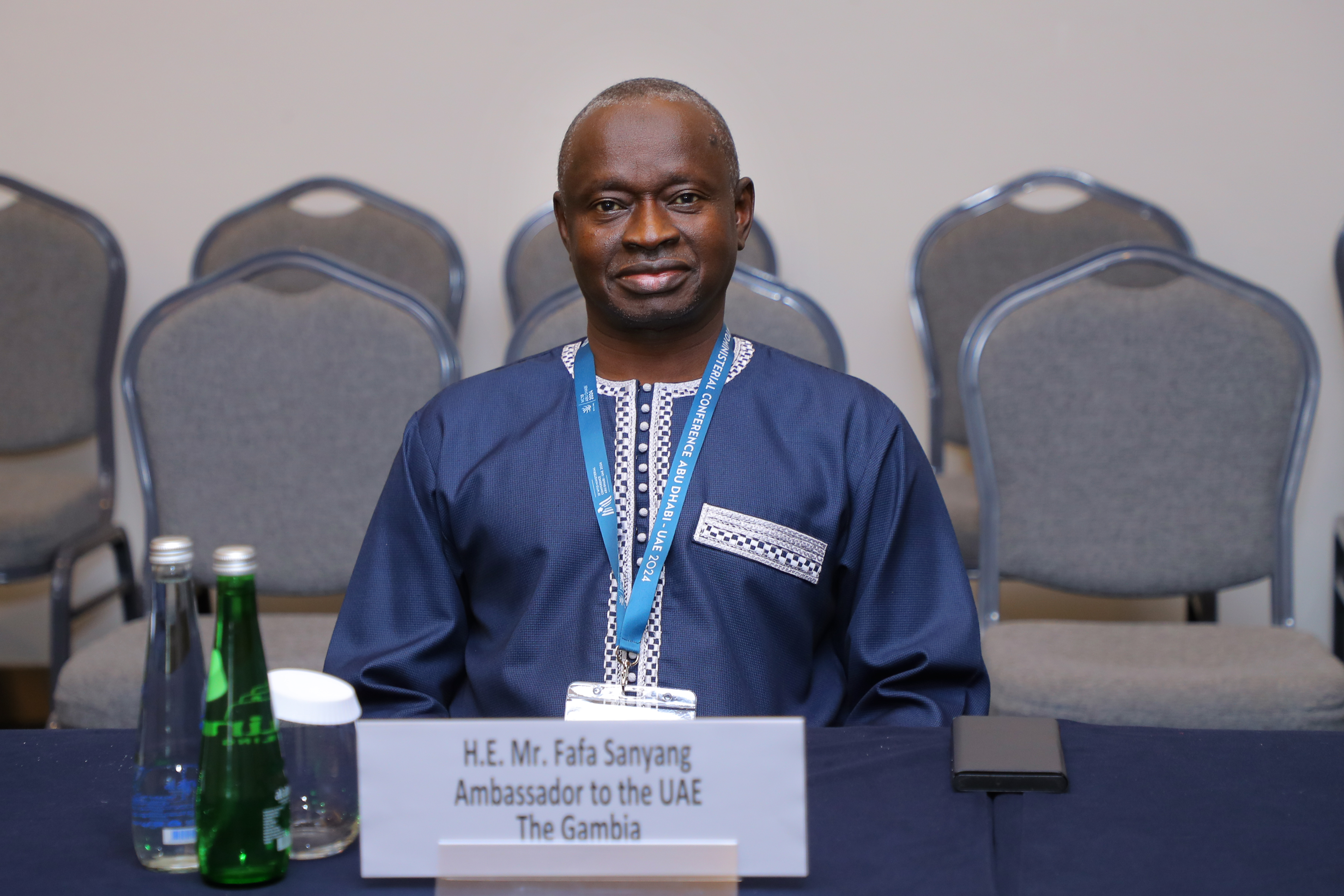

Minister of Energy and Petroleum
- In office 10 April 2017 – 4 May 2022
- President: Adama Barrow
- Succeeded by: Abdoulie Jobe

Personal details
- Party: NPP
- Education: University of Sierra Leone; Dalhousie University; University of Leeds

Fafa Sanyang is a Gambian politician and former civil servant who served as Minister of Energy and Petroleum in President Adama Barrow's cabinet from 2017 until a reshuffle in 2022.

== Early life and education ==
Sanyang was born in Kwinella and studied a bachelor's degree in geology at the University of Sierra Leone in 1989. He went on to obtain a master's degree in marine management from Dalhousie University, Canada, in 1997 and a further master's degree in engineering geology from Leeds University in the United Kingdom. He is a fellow of the Geological Society of London and a member of the Geological Society of Africa.

== Political and professional career ==
Sanyang was Director of the Geological Department of the Ministry of Petroleum from 1993 to 2006. He then became Commissioner for Petroleum in the ministry in 2006. He then became Permanent Secretary in the ministry in 2015. He was detained on 18 June 2016, along with three other senior civil servants. He was later released on bail but shortly into the bail was re-arrested by the National Intelligence Agency (NIA) and held in their custody. As he was not in court when the trial commenced on 28 September, it was suspended until 6 October so that he could be in court.

Sanyang was appointed as Minister of Energy and Petroleum on 10 April 2017. In late April, Sanyang oversaw the signing of a deal between the National Water and Electricity Company (NAWEC) and the Sino-hydro Corporation Company worth $165 million.
