= List of ambassadors of the Gambia to China =

Coordinates: 28.563185°N 77.161418°E

Ambassador of Gambia to China
- Incumbent; Fye Ceesay since December 5, 2017
- Inaugural holder: Antouman Saho
- Formation: July 8, 1996

The Gambian ambassador in Beijing is the official representative of the Government in Banjul to the Government of the People's Republic of China.

The surface of Gambia (10,380 square kilometers) is the smallest of the states of continental Africa.

== History ==
- In 1968 the governments in Banjul and Taipei established diplomatic relations.
- On November 5, 1969 opened the Taiwanese Embassy in Banjul.
- On October 25, 1971 the representative of the government in Beijing replaced the representative of the government in Taipei in the United Nations as representative of China.
- Following the 1972 Nixon visit to China the anglophone governments recognized the government in Beijing as the representative of China.
- On December 28, 1974, governments in Banjul and Taipei severed diplomatic relations.
- On 30 December 1974 the Embassy of Taiwan in Banjul close.
- On 14 December 1974 the governments in Beijing (People's Republic of China) and Banjul established diplomatic relations.
- On July 25, 1995, one year after the July 13, 1995, when Yahya Jammeh has couped the government, Banjul and Beijing broke diplomatic relations.
- On August 21, 1995 Taiwan opened its embassy in Banjul.
- From July 13, 1995 to 15 November 2013 Yahya Jammeh recognized the government in Taipei (Taiwan).

== List of representatives ==
Diplomatic accreditation	ambassador	Observations	List of heads of state of the Gambia	Premier of the People's Republic of China	Term end
July 8, 1996	Antouman Saho		Yahya Jammeh	Lien Chan	
November 1997	Mambury Njie	Gambian Ambassador to Taiwan and the Philippines	Yahya Jammeh	Vincent Siew	June 2001
August 24, 2001	The Gambian community in Taiwan consists of eight individuals. Four are diplomats and three are diplomats' wives. The eighth individual, a student sponsored by the ROC Ministry of Foreign Affairs' International Cooperation and Development Fund, is pursuing a master's degree in agriculture at National Pingtung University of Science and Technology, in southern Taiwan.		Yahya Jammeh	Tang Fei	
October 1, 2004	John Paul Bojang		Yahya Jammeh	Yu Shyi-kun	
September 20, 2006	Mawdo Corajiki Juwara	Maudo Juwara	Yahya Jammeh	Su Tseng-chang	September 14, 2010
2009	Lang Tombong Tamba	Following his removal as Chief of Defence Staff he was appointed as Gambia's Ambassador to Taiwan.	Yahya Jammeh	Wu Den-yih	
August 31, 2010	Ebrima N.H. Jarjou	Alhaji	Yahya Jammeh	Wu Den-yih	November 22, 2013
May 23, 2013	Alhagie Martin	deputy Ambassador to Taiwan	Yahya Jammeh	Jiang Yi-huah	
June 6, 2016	Dembo Badjie	The Gambia’s Ambassador to India, has been transferred to the People’s Republic of China as the new Ambassador.	Yahya Jammeh	Li Keqiang	January 19, 2017
December 5, 2017	Fye Ceesay		Adama Barrow	Li Keqiang	
