= Gambia Committee on Traditional Practices Affecting the Health of Women and Children =

NGO against female genital mutilation

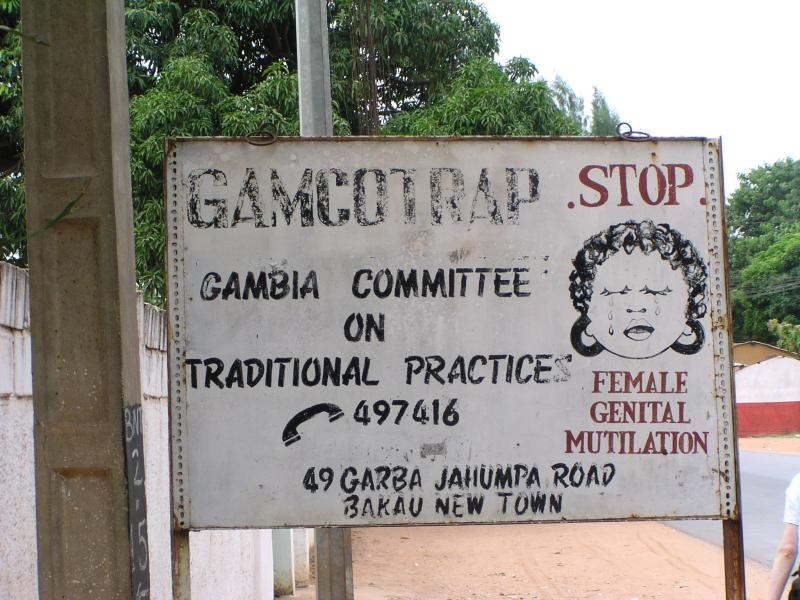
- A sign outside GAMCOTRAP's offices in Bakau New Town.
- Abbreviation: GAMCOTRAP
- Formation: 1984; 42 years ago
- Type: NGO
- Purpose: Activism, education
- Location: Bakau New Town, Banjul District, The Gambia
- Coordinates: 13°27′44.04″N 16°40′30.09″W
- Website: gamcotrap.org

The Gambia Committee on Traditional Practices Affecting the Health of Women and Children (GAMCOTRAP) is a Gambian NGO established in 1984. It campaigns against female genital mutilation, and aims to promote and secure health and empowerment for women through community education.
