= Omar A. Jallow =

Gambian politician (1946–2023)

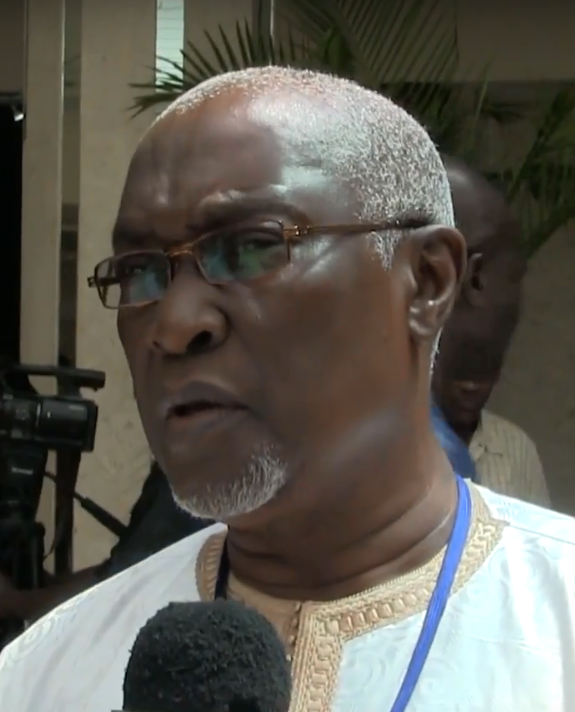
- Jallow in 2017

Minister of Agriculture
- In office 1 February 2017 – 9 July 2018
- Succeeded by: Lamin N. Dibba

Leader of the People's Progressive Party

Personal details
- Born: Omar Amadou Jallow; 26 October 1946 Serrekunda, The Gambia
- Died: 14 May 2023 (aged 76)
- Other political affiliations: Coalition 2016

Omar Amadou Jallow (26 October 1946 – 14 May 2023) was a Gambian politician who was the Minister of Agriculture in President Adama Barrow's cabinet. Jallow was also the leader of the People's Progressive Party, which held two seats in the National Assembly at the time of his death.

== Political career ==
Jallow was a People's Progressive Party government minister under Dawda Jawara, being the incumbent Minister of Agriculture when Yahya Jammeh executed the coup d'état that saw him seize power in 1994. Throughout Jammeh's time in power, Jallow was arrested on 22 separate occasions. He was tortured on four occasions. On the day of Adama Barrow's inauguration in February 2017, Jallow told Reuters "Today, I have been vindicated."

Jallow was re-appointed Minister of Agriculture by Barrow after he won the 2016 presidential election. However, Mr Jallow was fired in June 2018.

Jallow made a name for himself as a tough-talking Gambian politician with a liberal mind. He was Gambia's first politician to have called for the legalization of marijuana and to repeal the country's tough anti-gay laws. Jallow, a key member of the coalition that brought down Jammeh, also held a different opinion with the Gambian leader Barrow on whether he should stay in power for five years. Jallow always said Barrow should quit after three years even though Barrow has shown ambitions to stay for even ten years.

Jallow died on 14 May 2023.
