= List of ambassadors of the Gambia to the United States =

Coordinates: 38.958275°N 77.036758°W

Ambassador of Gambia to the United States
- Inaugural holder: Ousman Ahmadou Sallah
- Formation: April 17, 1979

The Gambian ambassador in Washington, D.C. is the official representative of the Government in Banjul to the Government of the United States, he has regularly coacredition at the governments in Ottawa (Canada), Brasília (Brazil), Mexico City (Mexico) and Caracas (Venezuela).

== Embassy ==
The Embassy of The Gambia in Washington, D.C. is located at 5630 16th Street. It is also listed as being at 2233 Wisconsin Avenue.

== List of representatives ==
Ambassador	Diplomatic agreement	Diplomatic accreditation	Background	President of the United States
Ousman Ahmadou Sallah	17 April 1979	10 May 1979		Jimmy Carter
Galandou Gorre-Ndiaye	7 August 1982		Charge d'affaires Former professor, University of Franche-Comté	Ronald Reagan
Lamin Abdou Mbye	26 August 1982	8 September 1982		Ronald Reagan
Ousman Ahmadou Sallah	12 August 1987	20 October 1987		Ronald Reagan
Crispin Grey-Johnson	1 September 1997	8 September 1997		Bill Clinton
John Paul Bojan	2 February 2000	3 February 2000		Bill Clinton
Essa Bokarr Sey	21 August 2000	25 September 2002		Bill Clinton
Dodou Bammy Jagne	28 January 2004	31 March 2004		George W. Bush
Tamsir Jallow	2 May 2008	30 June 2008	Recalled before presenting credentials	George W. Bush
Neneh MacDouall-Gaye	14 May 2009	20 May 2009	Minister of Information and Technology	Barack Obama
Alieu Momodou Ngum	15 May 2010	10 August 2010		Barack Obama
Sheikh Omar Faye	22 July 2015	3 August 2015		Barack Obama
Ebraima Manneh				Barack Obama
Dawda Fadera				
