= Gambia Party for Democracy and Progress =

Political party in the Gambia

The Gambia Party for Democracy and Progress (GPDP) is a small political party in the Gambia. It is led by Henry Gomez, a resident of Hamburg, Germany. The party initially launched Gomez as their presidential candidate for the 2006 elections, but he joined the UDP/NRP alliance after his candidature was refused by the IEC the party. The GPDP was part of the opposition Coalition 2016 for the 2016 presidential election, where Adama Barrow was selected as the opposition candidate and subsequently won.
