= Teneng Mba Jaiteh =

Gambian politician

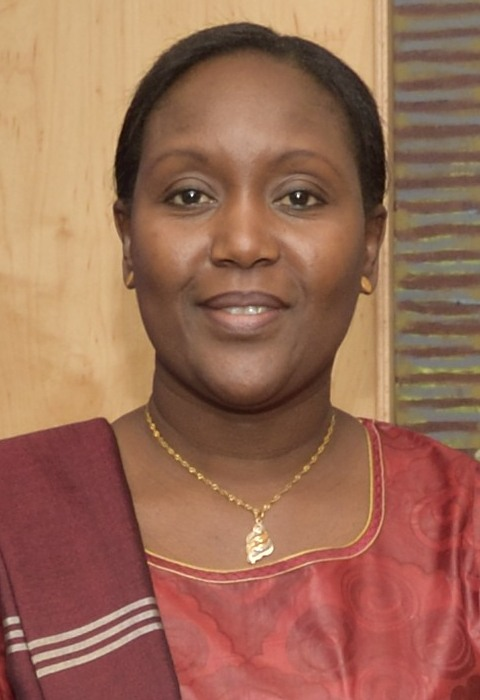
- Teneng Mba Jaiteh in 2014

Ambassador of the Gambia to the European Union
- In office January 2015 – January 2017

Minister of Energy

Secretary General of the Civil Service
- In office 2008–2009
- Preceded by: Ousman Jammeh

Personal details
- Education: University of Sierra Leone's Fourabay College, London School of Economics

Teneng Mba Jaiteh is a Gambian politician who served as Gambia's ambassador to the European Union as well as seven of its member states.

== Early life and education ==
Jaiteh was educated at the University of Sierra Leone's Fourabay College and the London School of Economics. She has a BA in History and an MSc in Development Studies.

== Career ==
Jaiteh served as Deputy State Secretary in The Gambia's Department of Finance and Economic Affairs in 2003, and as Secretary General of the Civil Service from 2008 to 2009, replacing Ousman Jammeh in the post.

On 29 May 2009, Jaiteh was appointed Deputy Minister of Petroleum and Mineral Resources by President Yahya Jammeh. She was later appointed Minister of Energy, but was relieved of that appointment on 17 February 2014 when Jammeh said the portfolio would come under his office. She became one of nearly 200 cabinet ministers and government officials to be hired and fired by Jammeh since he came to power in a 1994 coup. She was reinstated three days later.

In January 2015, Jaiteh was appointed as Gambia's ambassador to the European Union, based in Brussels also covering Germany, Poland, Netherlands, Luxembourg, Slovakia and the Czech Republic as well as the Organisation for the Prohibition of Chemical Weapons, the Organisation of African, Caribbean and Pacific States, the International Criminal Court and the World Trade Organization.

After the December 2016 election, Jaiteh was one of a dozen Gambian diplomats who backed President-elect Adama Barrow as the legitimate president and called on Jammeh to step down, sending a joint congratulatory letter to Barrow. In response, Jammeh's new Information Minister, Seedy Njie said in January 2017 that the twelve ambassadors had been fired.
