= Momodou Alieu Bah =

Gambian military officer and politician

- Military career
- Allegiance: Gambia
- Branch: Gambian Army

Momodou Alieu Bah is a former Gambian senior army officer, who served as Yahya Jammeh's last Minister of the Interior. Bah served as Minister of the Interior from 19 September 2016 to 18 January 2017, when he resigned as a result of the constitutional crisis.

== Military and political career ==
Bah has been a senior general in the Gambian Army. In 2006, he was arrested for taking part in an alleged coup attempt against President Yahya Jammeh, and sentenced to 25 years. He was pardoned in 2009 following testimony he gave for the prosecution at the trial of Lang Tombong Tamba. He was reinstated into the Gambian Armed Forces, where he became Director of Finance. In September 2016, Bah replaced Ousman Sonko as Minister of the Interior but resigned in January 2017 when Jammeh's term as President drew to a close. On 27 January, it was revealed that Bah had been re-appointed as Director of Finance, but he was later removed from the Armed Forces by President Adama Barrow on 27 February 2017.

Bah was relieved of his position as 1st Deputy Party Leader of the ARPC in June 2018; his successor in this position is Ousman Rambo Jatta.
