= Gambia Senior Secondary School =

Gambian school

Coordinates: 13.46036°N 16.58314°W

The Gambia Senior Secondary School (formerly the Gambia High School) is a school in Box Bar Road, Banjul, Gambia, founded by Wesleyan missionaries. It has educated two leaders of Gambia.

== History ==
The school was founded in 1876 in Dobson Street, Banjul, by Wesleyan missionaries. In 1898 it re-opened as the Methodist Boys' High School and in 1915 the associated Girls High School was opened.

The girls' and boys' high schools were merged in 1959 to create the Gambia High School and the location moved to Box Bar Road. Philip Beale was the principal from 1961 to 1966. While there, he jointly organised an archaeological expedition with pupils from the school to examine the Senegambian stone circles. In 1994, the name changed again to the Gambia Senior Secondary School.

== Notable alumni ==
- Fatim Badjie, Minister of Communications, Information and Information Technology and Minister of Health and Social Welfare, youngest person ever appointed to the Gambian Cabinet.
- Fatou Lamin Faye, Minister of Education from 2004
- Yahya Jammeh, leader of the Gambia from 1994 to 2017.
- Dawda Jawara, prime minister of Gambia from 1962 to 1970.
- Bai Modi Joof, lawyer
- Fatou Sanyang Kinteh, Minister for Women's Affairs, Children and Social Welfare
- Louis Mahoney, actor

== Principals ==
=== 1876 to 1958 ===
- 1876–1878: Rev. J. Fieldhouse
- 1878–1879: Rev. J. Heslam
- 1879–1884: C. R. Cross
- 1885–1889: J. Gilbert
- 1889–2900: G. P. Wilhelm
- 1901–1904: Circuits Ministers
- 1904–1907: W. T. Cole
- 1907–1909: Rev. C. Leopold
- 1909–1911: A. N. Walker
- 1912–1913: F. Dean
- 1913–1920: Rev. L. L. Leopold
- 1921–1922: W. E. Hoare
- 1922–1928: Rev. F. F. Morton
- 1929–1931: H. E .E. Burne
- 1932–1952: J. J. Baker
- 1953–1958: R. P. Pye

=== Girls High School ===
- 1915–1917: Mrs. P. S. Toye
- 1922–1927: Miss L. E. Morton
- 1928–1929: Miss C. E. Mason
- 1929–1936: Miss. R. M. Little
- 1937–1938: Miss. A. I. Spencer
- 1939–1956: Miss. N. Senior
- 1957–1958: Miss. V. Vodlcy

=== Gambia High School ===
- 1959–1961; J. S. Sergeants
- 1961–1966: P. E. Beale
- 1966–1974: E. F. Foss
- 1974–1976: J. J. Ndow
- 1976–1978: H. I. Jagne
- 1978–1980: R. D. Somers
- 1980–1986: H. I. Jagne
- 1986–1989: Mrs. D. E. S. Carrol
- 1989–1994: Mrs. Satang Jow
- 1994–2005: Rev. W. E. E. Carr
- 2005–present: Lamin M. B. Jaiteh
