= Gambia Moral Congress =

Political party in the Gambia

The Gambia Moral Congress (abbreviated GMC) is a political party in the Gambia. The party was founded by the lawyer Mai Ahmad Fatty in 2009. The motto of the party is People Power for Human Rights and Economic Justice. The GMC was part of the Coalition 2016 for the 2016 presidential election, where Adama Barrow was declared the coalition's candidate and subsequently won. Mai Ahmad Fatty is the interior minister of the current government. He previously served as Barrow's personal adviser during the political impasse.

== Electoral history ==
=== Presidential elections ===
Election	Candidate	Votes	%	Result
2016 (Note: Supported Adama Barrow as independent candidate for Coalition 2016.)	Adama Barrow	227,708	43.29%	Won ✓

=== National Assembly elections ===
Election	Leader	Votes	%	Seats	+/–	Position	Government
2017	Mai Ahmad Fatty	4,458	1.18%	0 / 45	New	▲7th	Extra-parliamentary
2022	Mai Ahmad Fatty	2,531	0.51%	0 / 45	0	▼8th	Extra-parliamentary
