= Minister of Tourism and Culture (The Gambia) =

Minister of Tourism and Culture of the Gambia
- Coat of arms of the Gambia
- Incumbent; Hamat Bah since 1 February 2017
- Appointer: President of the Gambia

Appointed by the President of Gambia, The Minister of Tourism and Culture is a cabinet position in the Gambia that oversees the Ministry of Tourism and Culture.

Specifically responsible for the Gambia Tourism Authority, the National Council for Arts and Culture, Arch 22, and the Gambia Hotel School. The Ministry of Tourism and Culture (MOTC) oversees the tourism sector and its associated government policies.

In Banjul and other regional institutions, the Minister is assisted by a team of civil servants. The chief adviser is the Permanent Secretary, who is also an accounting officer. There is also a Deputy Permanent Secretary who acts as the chief of staff of the ministry.

== List of ministers of tourism and culture ==
- Susan Waffa-Ogoo, 1996—August 2000
- Yankuba Touray, August 2000—October 2003
- Susan Waffa-Ogoo, September 2004—February 2006
- Angela Colley, February 2006—2008
- Nancy Njie, 26 March 2008—4 February 2010
- Fatou Mass Jobe-Njie, 4 February 2010—11 September 2014
- Benjamin A. Roberts, 11 September 2014—18 January 2017
- Hamat Bah, 1 February 2017—present
