= National Alliance for Democracy and Development =

Political alliance in the Gambia

The National Alliance for Democracy and Development (NADD) is a three-party coalition (previously five parties) of Gambian opposition political parties.

It was officially launched January 2005 with the signing of a memorandum of understanding (MoU) among the National Democratic Action Movement (NDAM), National Reconciliation Party (NRP), People's Democratic Organisation for Independence and Socialism (PDOIS), People's Progressive Party (PPP), and the United Democratic Party (UDP).

According to the MoU, "The goal of the alliance is to put an end to self-perpetuating rule, ensure the empowerment of the people so that they can participate in sustainable development."

In an interview with the BBC, UDP leader Ousainou Darboe was quoted as saying that the coalition's objective was not simply to remove President Yahya Jammeh from office, but to have concrete policies including far-reaching changes in the country's system of governance.

The UDP left the coalition during 2006.

The grouping contested the October 2006 presidential and January 2007 national assembly elections as a single entity to better challenge President Jammeh and the ruling Alliance for Patriotic Reorientation and Construction (APRC) party. It won 1 out of 53 seats.
