= Yankuba Sonko =

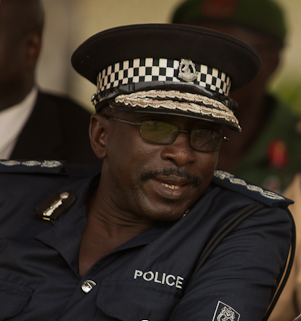

Inspector General of Police
- In office 13 July 2015 – 22 June 2017
- President: Yahya Jammeh; Adama Barrow
- Preceded by: Benjamin Wilson
- Succeeded by: Landing Kinteh
- In office 2 March 2010 – 27 November 2014
- President: Yahya Jammeh
- Preceded by: Ensa Badjie
- Succeeded by: Benjamin Wilson

Yankuba Sonko is a Gambian police officer who was the Inspector General of Police in the Gambia from 2010 to 2014, and from 2015 to 2017.

== Career ==
Sonko joined the Gambia Police Force in 1982 and was promoted to the rank of Corporal in 1984, and to Cadet Officer in 1988. He studied at the Nigerian Police Training School in 1990, and, upon his return in 1991, he helped to found the Police Intervention Unit (PIU) and was posted to Barra Police Station in the North Bank Region. He was appointed as the force's first Public Relations Officer (PRO) in 1993 and was posted to Kanifing Division as second-in-command in 1994. In 1995, he became the officer commanding Kanifing Division.

In 1998, Sonko became the officer commanding the Fraud Squad, and the next year he was appointed as Crime Management Coordinator (CMC) at the rank of Assistant Superintendent of Police (ASP). In 1999, he was also deployed on a UN mission in East Timor, where he was regional commander of one of the mission's 13 regions. He returned in 2000 and became the commanding officer of the PIU. In 2001, he was reassigned as officer commanding Kanifing Division. In 2002, he left the Gambia to study law in the UK and returned in 2007. He was posted as the acting Commissioner of the PIU, and then became officer commanding in the Prosecution Division. In 2008, he was appointed as the Crime Management Coordinator again.

On 18 December 2009, Sonko was promoted to Deputy Inspector General of Police. He served as Inspector General of Police from March 2010 to 2014. He was replaced by Benjamin Wilson but was reinstated, in turn, to replace Wilson on 13 July 2015.
