= Trade unions in the Gambia =

- National organization(s): GWC
- Regulatory authority: Ministry of Trade, Industry, Regional Integration and Employment
- Primary legislation: Labour Act 2007

International Labour Organization
- The Gambia is a member of the ILO

Convention ratification
- Freedom of Association: 4 September 2000
- Right to Organise: 4 September 2000

Trade unions in The Gambia are regulated under the Labour Act 2007. The first trade union was the Bathurst Trade Union (BTU), founded in 1929, which led a general strike that year. General strikes were also led by the Gambia Workers' Union (GWU) in 1960, 1961, 1967, and 1970, although not all were successful. There are three trade union centres in The Gambia: the Gambia Trade Union Bureau (GamTUB), the Gambian Workers' Confederation (GWC), and the Gambia National Trade Union Congress (GNTUC). The country joined the International Labour Organization (ILO) in 1995.

== History ==
=== Origins ===
Gambian mansolu (Mandinka elders) could traditionally declare tongs, collective refusals to sell to merchants unless they met certain demands. According to Matthew James Park, a tong was "substantively similar to a strike, but it carried the weight of 'tradition' and was thus seen in a more positive light by the administration for a longer time." Musa Molloh, King of Fulladu, declared an 1885 tong in response to the actions of a merchant. Molloh forbade the trade of groundnuts, and was willing to "keep the nuts till they spoil and make soap of them" rather than sell them.

Low wages, low rations, and poor working conditions led to several industrial actions (including strikes) in the early 20th century. The first notable action was a 1904 strike by members of the Gambia Company, West African Frontier Force. In response to low wages, the soldiers deserted their posts, held demonstrations, and refused to work. Beginning in 1919, dock workers in Kuntaur struck in response to wage cuts by groundnut merchants. The strike, described as a "riot" by the colonial government, was blamed on the dockworkers having developed a "Bathurst mentality" and experiencing the "accompaniments of civilization." After the strike, the colonial government asserted more control over the wharf towns and increased its police presence. A tong was declared in Kuntaur in 1923 for similar reasons, supported this time by colonial officials; a tong evoked the prospect of a tradition-backed rural rebellion with a power base in the villages, and a strike did not.

During the 1920s, collective action increased in Bathurst. The Carpenters' and Shipwrights' Society went on strike in 1921, and mechanics successfully struck that year for higher wages. The state intervened in the latter strike, mediating between workers and employers, and reviewed the cost of living in the city. This created an expectation among other workers of further concessions, but the colonial government imagined that it had settled the "labour question" for the foreseeable future.

=== Bathurst Trade Union ===
==== 1929 strike ====
The general labour position in Gambia is a chapter of the old story of imperialism. The final stage of imperialism has almost reached completion; the State machine is being continually lurred from "benevolent" and "philanthropic" uses to serve exclusive capitalist interests; the Negro workers and peasants are the hopeless underdogs of the situation - the forsaken victims of capitalist and imperialist exploitation.

— Edward Francis Small at the International Conference of Negro Workers, July 1930

The Bathurst Trade Union (BTU), the first Gambian trade union, was founded during an industrial dispute by artisans and labourers in Bathurst (the Gambian capital). The country was still under British colonial rule, from which it would not emerge until independence in 1965. The principal leader of the BTU was Edward Francis Small, a Gambian nationalist, journalist, and politician who had led the Gambian branch of the National Congress of British West Africa (NCBWA). The union was founded in 1928, and opposed attempts by Bathurst companies the following year to reduce the daily wages of labourers from six to five shillings. The BTU asked the government to intervene and review the cost of living (as it had done in 1921), but it refused to intervene or supplement wages.

On 18 October 1929, 400 workers went on strike in Bathurst. The Gambian chamber of commerce, which represented employers, called on the colonial government to ban picket lines; it agreed, invoking the Conspiracy and Protection of Property Act 1875. Unable to picket, labour leaders (including Small) were forced to otherwise develop support for the strike. Small proposed a 25-day sitdown strike, and worked to ensure that hungry sailors would be supported. Most support for the strike was from sailors, masons, carpenters, shipwrights, and dock workers who were unable to successfully negotiate with employers without a union; other workers in Bathurst secured deals independent of the trade union.

On 6 November, police were summoned to disperse a crowd of 100 striking workers. Four days later, 200-300 strikers blocked traffic and shut down main streets in Bathurst; police dispersed the crowd with a bayonet charge. Police searched the town for strikers throughout the night, and two officers and one striker were hospitalised. The incident caused an outcry in Bathurst, and the employers hurriedly organised a conference with the union and conceded substantial wage increases.

==== 1930–1933 ====
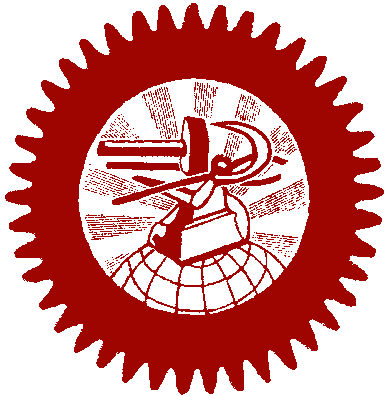
1922 logo of Profintern, which oversaw the ITUCNW

Small spent much of 1930–1932 trying to secure foreign financial assistance for the BTU and left the union in the hands of his lieutenant, Thomas Collingwood Fye. Small had alienated the colonial government and the Colonial Office by affiliating the BTU with the League against Imperialism (LAI) and the International Trade Union Committee of Negro Workers (ITUCNW), which were associated with Comintern (and the latter with Profintern). The BTU was also affiliated with the Labour Research Department (LRD), which mobilised support for the union during the 1929 strike.

Small attended the International Conference of Negro Workers in Hamburg, organised by the ITUCNW, in July 1930. He spoke at the conference and was elected to the ITUCNW executive board and appointed associate editor of its newspaper, The Negro Worker. Small may also have attended the fifth conference of Profintern later that year. He was labelled a Communist sympathiser by the Colonial Office and harassed by West African colonial governments, who restricted his travel and removed his privileges.

The 1929 strike apparently influenced Sidney Webb's 1930 Passfield Memorandum, which stipulated that British colonies should establish constitutional mechanisms for registering trade unions. This was resisted in most colonies other than The Gambia, where it was seen as an opportunity to weaken Small's influence. The Legislative Council passed a trade-union ordinance in December 1932, which received royal assent a month later. Three of Small's political opponents registered the Bathurst Trade Union in March 1933, despite Small's objections. Following advice from the Gambian government, Secretary of State for the Colonies Philip Cunliffe-Lister refused to intervene. In the British House of Commons, Cunliffe-Lister said: "Registration of trade unions in the Gambia is now compulsory, and, according to the latest information in my possession, the only union so registered is the Bathurst Trade Union. I understand that Mr. Small is not a member of this Trade Union."

=== Colonial trade unionism ===
==== Gambia Labour Union ====
Small founded the Gambia Labour Union (GLU) in 1935 after losing control of the BTU. The GLU was an affiliate of the International Confederation of Free Trade Unions (ICFTU) from 1949 to 1962; it was also affiliated with the International Federation of Christian Trade Unions and its African branch, the Pan-African Union of Believing Workers. According to David Perfect, the GLU was never an effective union, and after Small's death in 1958 was "little more than a social club for his former associates." Its 1960 leadership was retired senior artisans and civil servants, who participated in trade unionism "on a part-time basis" and did not believe in striking.

During the 1940s, I.M. Garba-Jahumpa became secretary of the GLU. Garba-Jahumpa and Small worked together for a time, but later quarrelled; Garba-Jahumpa left the GLU, forming the Gambia Amalgamated Trade Union (GATU). The GLU rekindled its relationship with Garba-Jahumpa and, after the 1962 election, became affiliated with his Gambia Congress Party (GCP). The GLU's political impact before independence in 1965 was "very limited." None of its leaders stood for election, it did not attend constitutional talks with the United Kingdom, and it opposed the 1960 and 1961 general strikes called by the Gambia Workers' Union.

==== Gambia Workers' Union ====
The Gambia Workers' Union (GWU) was founded in late 1956 by M. E. Jallow. Jallow had worked in the government and commercial sectors before organising the workers of the Gambia Construction Company into a society. The society became the GWU, with Jallow as general secretary, and was registered in July 1958. Jallow worked with former GLU general secretary A. W. Loum to build the union, which then began to generate labour unrest in the Bathurst docks in August 1959. The GWU led a series of strikes, which led to wage and bonus increases for dock workers. Its success led other labourers in the city to join the union.

In February 1960, the GWU led a general strike. The strike had three motivations: to challenge the Gambia Oilseeds Marketing Board (GOMB), which had signed a contract for its groundnut steamers to be loaded by non-unionised labour; to seek official recognition from the government and revise the mechanism of wage negotiation, and to prove its effectiveness to Bathurst workers by securing a large minimum wage increase. After the strike, the GOMB reverted to employing unionised labour; the outdated labour machinery was transformed by the establishment of joint industrial councils, and the government's minimum wage was raised by 25 percent. The union led a second general strike in January 1961, after negotiations broke down for a 90-percent increase in the minimum wage. This strike was also successful, leading to a further 13-percent increase in the minimum wage, and the government and employers were forced to concede a check-off system of union-dues collection.

The GWU affiliated with the International Confederation of Free Trade Unions (ICFTU) and its African Regional Organisation (ARO) in 1963. It was also affiliated with the African Trade Union Confederation (ATUC), the International Transport Workers' Federation (ITWF), and the International Federation of Petroleum and Chemical Workers (IFPCW).

==== Other trade unions ====
After he left the GLU in the 1940s, Garba-Jahumpa persuaded a number of other trade union leaders to join him; in January 1947, he founded the Gambia Amalgamated Trade Union (GATU) as a rival of the GLU. According to Hughes and Perfect, "there can be little doubt that this was a deliberate maneuver designed to secure him votes in the forthcoming Legislative Council election." A European trade union officer "sympathetic to [Garba-Jahumpa] and hostile to Small" said that in 1947, the GATU had between 250 and 1,000 members and the GLU less than 50. Small won the 1947 election, and the GATU was wound up in 1948. Another trade union which was founded to improve support in an election was the Motor Drivers' and Mechanics Union (MDMU), founded by John Colley Faye before the 1951 Legislative Council election.

==== Impact on independence ====
Unlike several other African countries, trade unions in The Gambia "did not feature prominently in stimulating or organizing radical opposition to the government" before independence. Perfect wrote that although the political impact of the GWU far outweighed that of the GLU, its importance "should not be overstated."

=== Post-colonial trade unionism ===
Following independence in 1965, the Gambia Workers' Union opposed the Republic Bill proposed by the People's Progressive Party (PPP) government of Dawda Jawara. The union believed that Jawara sought to remove constitutional safeguards which prevented him from restricting trade unions and banning strikes. PPP politicians revived the National Farmers and General Workers Union (NFGWU), founded in 1964, to draw members from the GWU and weaken it. The GWU campaign was successful, however, and in February 1967 it called the first post-independence general strike to demand wage increases; the strike failed. The union called another general strike in January 1970, which also failed because it was depicted by the government as a political anti-PPP strike.

The Gambia Labour Union opposed the GWU's post-independence general strikes, and became a close ally of the PPP government. It adopted a Marxist ideology during the mid-1960s, and affiliated with the World Federation of Trade Unions (WFTU) in 1967. The GLU admired the North Korean leader Kim Il Sung, and awarded scholarships to young Gambians to attend Patrice Lumumba University in Moscow.

The GWU called for a general strike in 1977 in support of sacked Gambia Utilities Corporation (GUC) workers, but it was suppressed by the government. In January 1977, the union was decertified.

Trade unions and labour organisations
Name	Acronym	Industry	Founded	President or general secretary	Affiliations
Gambia Press Union	GPU	journalists	1979	Sheriff Bojang Jnr.	IFJ
Gambia Transport Drivers' Union		drivers		Omar Ceesay	
Gambia Transport, Agricultural, Food and Industrial Workers Union	GTAFIWU	generalist		Mustapha Jobe	
Gambia National Transport Control Association		transport workers		Jarga Faal	
Gambia Teachers' Union	GTU	Education		Marie Antionette Corr	
Gambia Dock and Maritime Workers' Union		dock workers and sailors		Lang Bala Saho	
Gambia Association of Resident Doctors	GARD	doctors	2012		
University of the Gambia Faculty and Staff Association	UTGFSA	higher education workers		Alieu Gibba	
University of the Gambia Students' Union	UTGSU	higher education students			
Gambia Trade Union Bureau	GamTUB		2009	Kebba Masaneh Ceesay	
Gambian Workers' Confederation	GWC	trade union confederation			ITUC
Gambia Labour Congress	GLC				
Gambia National Trade Union Congress	GNTUC	trade union confederation		Ebrima Garba Cham	
Gambia Horticulture and General Workers Union					
Gambia Hotel, Restaurant and Catering Workers union					
National Committee of Informal Workers union					
Committee for Public Service Employees					
Gambia Pensioners Association					
Gambia Bar Association	GBA		before 1965	Salieu Taal	

== Sources ==
- Hughes, Arnold; Perfect, David (2006). A Political History of The Gambia, 1816-1994. Rochester, NY: University of Rochester Press.
- Park, Matthew James (2016). Heart of Banjul: The History of Banjul, The Gambia, 1816-1965 (PhD). Michigan State University.
- Perfect, David (1986). "Organized Labour and Politics in The Gambia: 1960–85". Labour, Capital and Society. 19 (2): 168–199. JSTOR 43157755.
