= List of political parties in the Gambia =

This article lists political parties in the Gambia. The Gambia was a multi-party political system starting from the 1960s, with the People's Progressive Party (PPP) led by president Dawda Jawara serving as the dominant party after the Gambia gained independence in 1965. Following the 1994 Gambian coup d'état, Yahya Jammeh was installed as president, and in 1996, the Alliance for Patriotic Reorientation and Construction (APRC) was established as the dominant party. Many opposition parties were either banned or suppressed and the APRC managed to stay in power with little opposition until 2016, when Jammeh was defeated by opposition candidate Adama Barrow in the presidential elections.

== Parties ==
As of 2026, there are currently 27 registered parties in the Gambia.

=== Parliamentary parties ===
Name	Abbr.	Founded	Leader	Political position	Ideology	Assembly
National People's Party	NPP	2019	Adama Barrow	Centre	Social conservatism	22 / 58
United Democratic Party	UDP	1996	Ousainou Darboe	Centre-left	Social liberalism; Constitutionalism; Social democracy	15 / 58
National Reconciliation Party	NRP	1996	Hamat Bah	Centre-right	Reconciliation; Constitutionalism; Populism	4 / 58
Alliance for Patriotic Reorientation and Construction	APRC	1996	Fabakary Jatta	Right-wing	Anti-colonialism; Religious conservatism; Right-wing populism	3 / 58
People's Democratic Organisation for Independence and Socialism	PDOIS	1986	Halifa Sallah	Left-wing	Socialism	2 / 58

=== Other parties ===
Name	Abbr.	Founded	Leader	Political position	Ideology
All Inclusive Party	AIP	2026	Yiramang Darboe		
All Peoples Party	APP		Essa Mbye Faal		
Alliance for Democracy and Development	ADD		Malik Camara		
Alliance for National Re-orientation and Development	ANRD		Lamin Satu Bojang		
Alliance of Progressive Citizens	APC	2025	Modou Lamin Sima		
Citizens’ Alliance	CA		Ismaila Ceesay		
Democratic Party	DP		Yusupha Dumbuya		
Gambia Action Party	GAP		Musa Yali Batchilly		
Gambia Alliance for National Unity	GANU		Sheikh Tijan Hydara		
Gambia Democratic Congress	GDC	2016	Mama Kandeh	Centre to centre-left	Social democracy Third Way
Gambia For All	GFA		Bakary B. Dabo		
Gambia Labour Party	GLP	2026	Bakusa Dukureh		
Gambia Moral Congress	GMC	2009	Mai Ahmad Fatty		
Gambia Party for Democracy and Progress	GPDP	2006	Henry Gomez		
Gambia People's Advancement Party	GPAP	2025	Papa Faal		
National Builders Party	NBP	2026	Ansu Sanneh		
National Convention Party	NCP	1975	Abubacarr M. A. Kinteh	Centre-left	
National Democratic Party	NDP	2026	Kebba Bojang		
National Unity Party	NUP		Abdoulie Ebrima Jammeh		
People's Alliance Party	PAP		Ebrima Tabora Manneh		
People's Progressive Party	PPP	1959	Ousman Madikay Faal	Centre to centre-left	Third Way; Agrarianism
Unite for Nation, Integrity, Transformation and Equality	UNITE	2026	Talib Ahmed Bensouda		

=== Defunct parties ===
- Coalition 2016
- Democratic Congress Alliance
- Gambia National Party
- Gambia Socialist Revolutionary Party
- Gambian People's Party
- Muslim Congress Party
- National Alliance for Democracy and Development
- National Democratic Action Movement
- United Party
