= 2026 Gambian presidential election =

- 5 December 2026
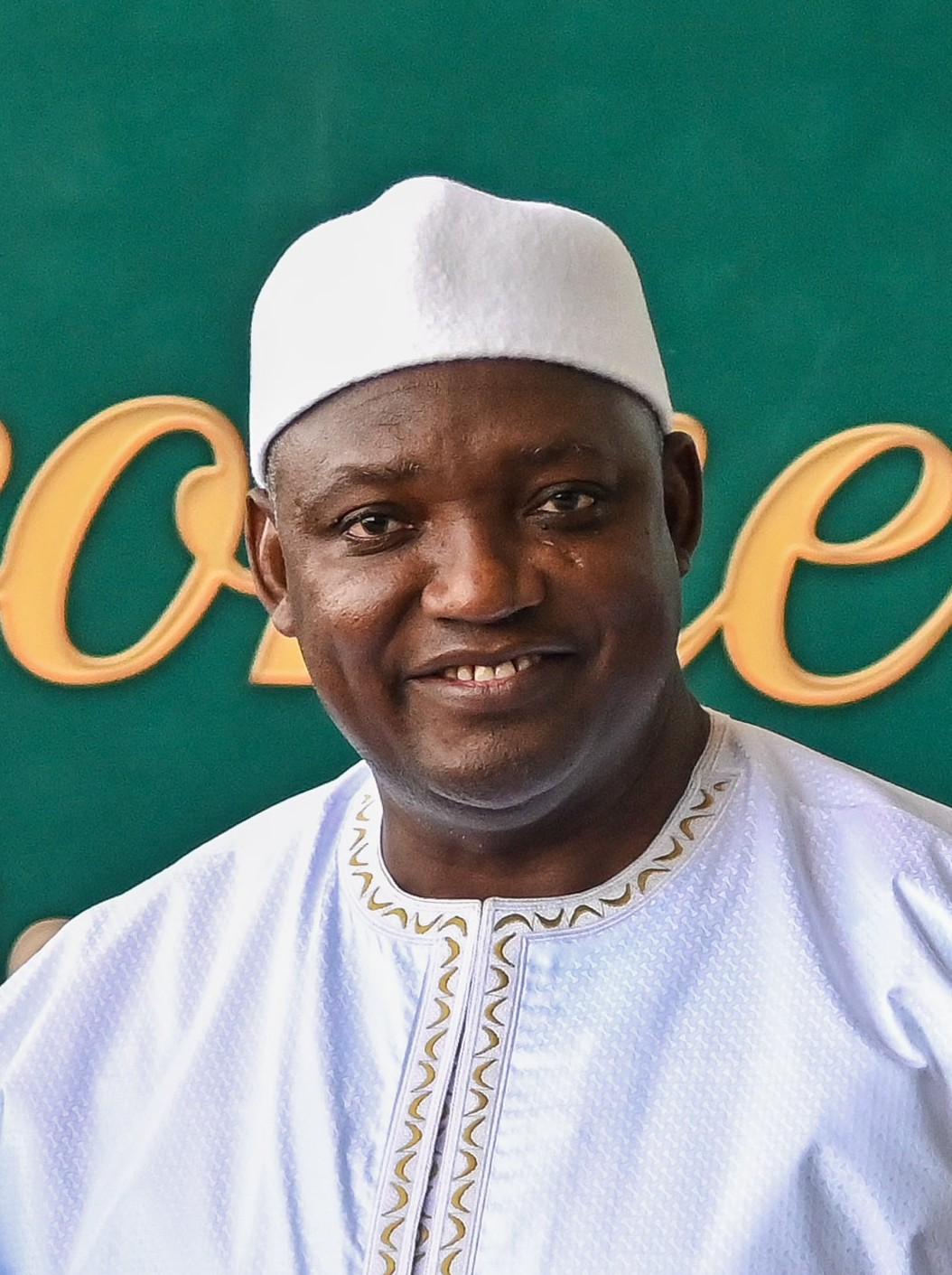

Nominee	Adama Barrow	Ousainou Darboe
Party	NPP	UDP
- Results by constituency
Incumbent President
Adama Barrow
NPP

Presidential elections are scheduled to be held in the Gambia on 5 December 2026. Incumbent president Adama Barrow is running for a third term.

== Background ==
The proposed Constitution Promulgation Bill of 2020 was officially rejected in September 2020. 31 lawmakers voted in favor of the bill and 23 voted against. The country’s constitution requires a three-quarters supermajority of all members to pass its second reading and advance to a public referendum.

The 2020 draft constitution remains an important part of the debate surrounding the 2026 election. The draft proposed a two-term limit for presidents with a retroactive provision that would have counted incumbent president Adama Barrow's first term. Said provision was one of the most contentious issues during the reform process, as its adoption would have limited Barrow to only one additional term and prevented him from running in 2026.

Under the current constitution, there are no term limits, making Barrow eligible to seek re-election. On 16 November 2026, the Independent Electoral Commission of Gambia approved Barrow's candidacy for a third term. Ousainou Darboe, leader of the United Democratic Party (UDP) and former vice president under Barrow, has consistently accused Barrow of obstructing the process to extend his hold on power, a claim the president's supporters reject.

== Electoral system ==
The President of the Gambia is elected in a single round by first-past-the-post voting for a five-year term. Registered voters receive a voter's card which must be presented at the assigned polling station. After verifying eligibility, a polling officer marks the voter's left forefinger with indelible ink.

Instead of using paper ballots, elections in the Gambia are conducted using marbles. Each voter receives a marble and places it in a tube on top of a sealed drum that corresponds to that voter's favoured candidate. The drums for different candidates are painted in different colours corresponding to the party affiliation of the candidate, and a picture of the candidate is affixed to their corresponding drum. The drums are placed in the booth concealed from the officials to preserve ballot secrecy; the insertion of a marble rings a bell inside to signal that the vote has been cast.

During the tallying process, a candidate's drum is unsealed and its contents emptied in batches on hole boards with a capacity of 200 to 500 marbles each. Once the tellers agree on the number of marbles, the drum is refilled and retained for use in a recount, and the tellers pass to the next candidate's urn. This process, repeated in each polling station, is very fast; the results are generally known at the national level the day after the vote.

The system has the advantages of low cost and simplicity, both for understanding how to vote and for counting the results. The method is reported to have an extremely low error rate for miscast ballots.

== Candidates ==
Candidate submissions closed on 14 November 2026. The Independent Electoral Commission of Gambia approved nine candidates, with seven applicants being rejected.

Name	Party	Position	Ref
Adama Barrow	National People's Party	President of the Gambia (since 2017)	
Ousainou Darboe	United Democratic Party	Vice President of the Gambia (2018–2019)	
Talib Ahmed Bensouda	Unite for Nation, Integrity, Transformation and Equality	Mayor of Kanifing Municipal Council (2018–2026)	
Lamin J. Darbo	Independent		
Almameh Gibba	Independent		
Ebrima Tabora Manneh	People's Alliance Party		
Ansu Sanneh	National Builders Party		
Modou Lamin Sima	Alliance of Progressive Citizens	Ambassador at Large for Business and Investment	
Isatou Touray	Independent	Vice President of the Gambia (2019–2022)	

== Opinion polling ==
Polling firm	Date of polling	Ref.	Barrow	Darboe	Bensouda	Kandeh	Faal	Others	Undecided	Sample Size	Lead
Gambia Participates	10 August 2026		32	25	19	2	3	2	17	1,556	7
CepRass (Note: Poll as commissioned by Gambia Participates and conducted by CepRass.)	July 2025		31	12	18	3	3	3	29	1,556	13
2021 election	4 December 2021		53.23	27.72	-	12.32	2	4.73	-	859,567	25.51
