= 2022 Gambian coup attempt =

Gambian coup d'état attempt

2022 Gambian coup d'état attempt
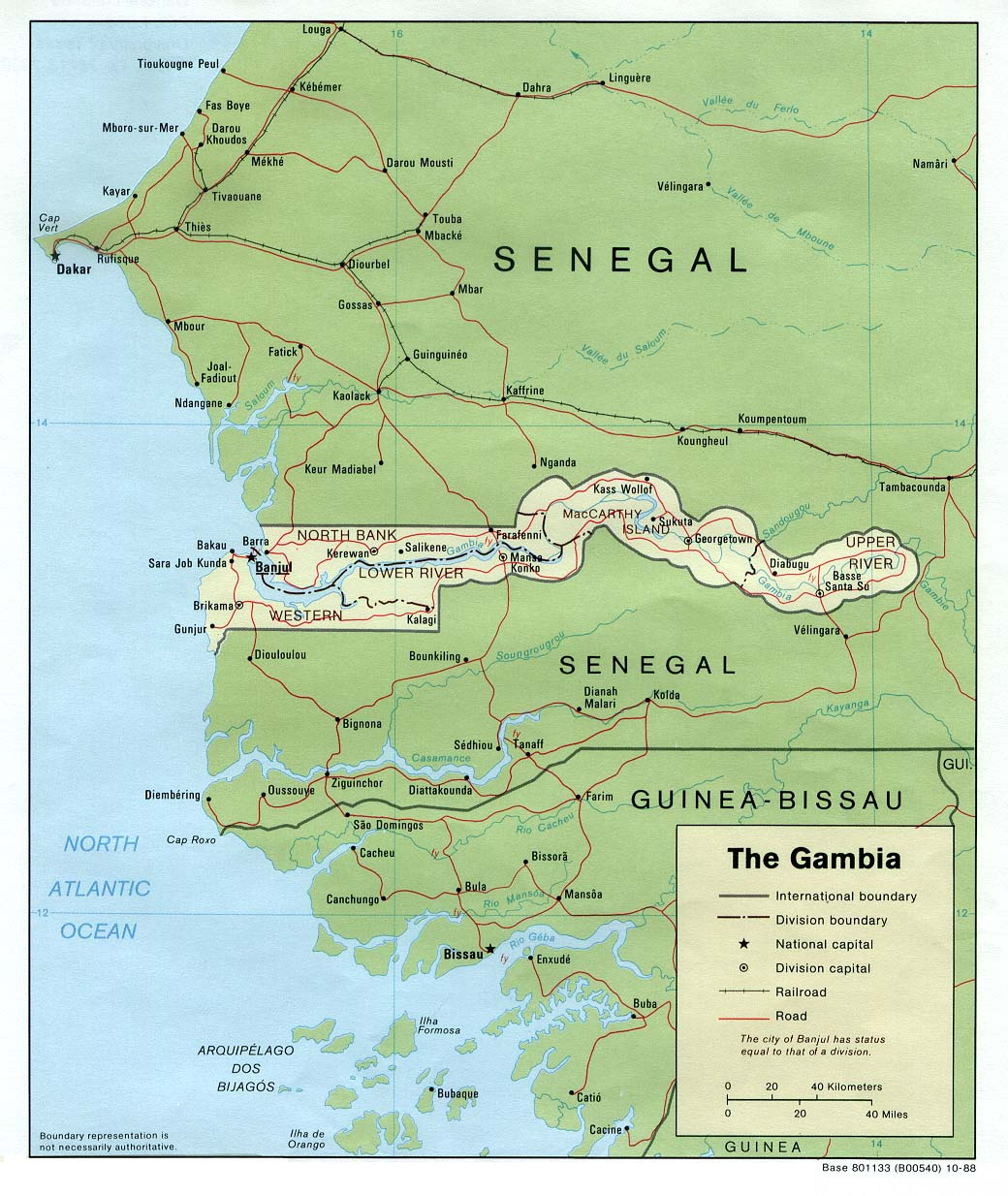
- Map of the Gambia in West Africa
Date	20 December 2022
Location	Banjul, The Gambia
Result	Coup failure

Belligerents
(The Gambia) Government of the Gambia (The Gambia) Gambia Armed Forces	Some members of the Gambia Armed Forces and other collaborators

Commanders and leaders
Adama Barrow	Sanna Fadera

Casualties and losses
None reported	11 arrested

The 2022 Gambian coup attempt was a military coup d'état attempt which took place in The Gambia on 20 December 2022. Reportedly, some soldiers attempted to overthrow the government of President Adama Barrow. Four soldiers were arrested on suspicion of involvement. The Gambian military initially denied that any such coup attempt took place. It also went after three other alleged conspirators. The coup leader was later named as LCpl Sanna Fadera. The attempt was condemned by Economic Community of West African States (ECOWAS) and the main opposition party, the UDP.

UDP leader Momodou Sabally, who had served as the minister of presidential affairs under Yahya Jammeh, had suggested in a video released before the coup that Barrow would be overthrown before the 2023 Gambian local elections. He was arrested after the government foiled the plot, but was later released unconditionally. On 3 January 2023 the government charged two civilians and a sub-inspector of The Gambia Police Force for taking part in the plot. Eight soldiers were later charged on 6 January.

== See also ==
- 2014 Gambian coup d'état attempt
