= 1954 Gambian parliamentary election =

Parliamentary elections were held in the Gambia in 1954 following constitutional amendments, which increased the number of elected members on the Legislative Council from three to four, with an additional seven non-elected members. The seven unelected members were the Colonial Secretary, Financial Secretary, the Attorney General, the Senior Commissioner, Dr. S.H.O Jones (director of Medical Services), and two members appointed by the Governor-general from a list of nine names submitted by the Bathurst Town Council and the Kombo Rural Authority after consultation with members of the council.

== Results ==
| Constituency | Candidate | Party | Votes | % | Notes |
|---|---|---|---|---|---|
| Bathurst | Pierre Sarr N'Jie | United Party | 2,123 | 28.4 | Elected |
| Bathurst | John Colley Faye | Democratic Party | 1,979 | 26.5 | Elected |
| Bathurst | I.M. Garba-Jahumpa | Muslim Congress Party | 1,569 | 21.0 | Elected |
| Bathurst | George St Clair Joof | Gambian People's Party | 252 | 3.4 | |
| Bathurst | Total | | 5,923 | 100 | |
| Bathurst | Registered voters/turnout | | 6,286 | 94.23 | |
| Kombo St Mary | Henry Madi | Independent | 904 | 58.2 | Elected |
| Kombo St Mary | Samuel Oldfield | Independent | 650 | 41.8 | |
| Kombo St Mary | Total | | 1,554 | 100 | |
| Kombo St Mary | Registered voters/turnout | | | 97 | |
Source: Hughes & Perfect
