= Alagie Barrow =

Gambian-American army officer

- Military career
- Allegiance: United States
- Branch: Tennessee Army National Guard
- Service years: 2001–2014
- Rank: Captain
- Conflicts: 2014 Gambian coup d'état attempt

Alagie Barrow is the author of The Dictator Is Us. He is a prolific writer and radio commentator whose body of works has been published in numerous newspapers. He was born in The Gambia and is a former Army National Guard officer in the United States. He was one of the plotters in the 2014 Gambian coup d'état attempt targeting Yahya Jammeh, the brutal military dictator who ruled Gambia for 22 years. For his role, Alagie pleaded guilty to violating the USA Neutrality Act of 1794 and received a six-month sentence to jail. Barrow was appointed as the director of research for the Gambian Truth, Reconciliation and Reparations Commission (TRRC) in August 2018. He wrote The Dictator Is Us and donated 100% of the proceeds to the victims of the Yahya Jammeh dictatorship. Alagie is a well-respected voice in The Gambia and an influential thought leader who is often invited to functions to speak about various topics.

== Early life and education ==
Barrow was born in Jah Kunda, a hamlet a few miles from Nyakoi in the Upper River Division. He graduated from Nasir Ahmadiya Senior Secondary School in 1993 and moved to Tennessee, United States in 1994. He graduated from Tennessee State University with a major in criminal justice and a minor in psychology. He then graduated from the American Military University in West Virginia with a master's degree in national security studies.

== Career ==
Barrow joined the Tennessee Army National Guard in 2001 and was commissioned as an officer in 2008. He was mobilised for deployment in 2003 during the Iraq War, but his unit never ended up deploying. During his time in the National Guard he served as a suicide prevention officer, an illicit drugs prevention officer, a public affairs office, and a career counselor. In January 2014, he left the military, and joined REGAL-BELOIT as an account manager.

Barrow also worked as an investigator and security consultant in the private sector in the United States, as a justice advocate with the Nashville Juvenile Justice Center, and as an instructor at Vanderbilt University Reserve Officers' Training Corps (ROTC).

In August 2018, Barrow was appointed as the director of research at the Truth, Reconciliation and Reparations Commission (TRRC) by its secretary, Baba Galleh Jallow. Some objected to his appointment on the grounds that a convicted felon should not hold the role. However, many consider him a hero and appladed his hiring. He is widely regarded as an instrumental person in the success of the Commission.
