= 1947 legislative election =

1947 legislative elections may refer to:

- 1947 Gambian legislative election
- 1947 Polish legislative election
- 1947 Sri Lankan legislative election
