= 1951 Gambian parliamentary election =

- 1951

All 3 elected seats in the Legislative Council

Parliamentary elections were held in the Gambia in 1951. They were the first election to feature political parties, as the Democratic Party and the Muslim Congress Party had been founded earlier in the year.

== Results ==
There were only three elected seats in the Legislative Council at the time.

Constituency	Candidate	Party	Votes	%	Notes
Bathurst	John Colley Faye	Democratic Party	905	40.01	Elected
Bathurst	I.M. Garba-Jahumpa	Muslim Congress Party	828	36.60	Elected
Bathurst	Pierre Sarr N'Jie	Independent	463	20.47	
Bathurst	Edward Francis Small	Gambia National League	45	1.99	
Bathurst	Mustapha Colley	Common People's Party	10	0.44	
Bathurst	J Francis Senegal	Independent	6	0.27	
Bathurst	John Finden Dailey	Common People's Party	5	0.22	
Kombo St Mary	Henry Madi	Independent	813	75.63	Elected
Kombo St Mary	Howsoon Semege-Janneh	Independent	255	23.72	
Kombo St Mary	John Kuye	Independent	7	0.65	
Total			3,337	–	
Source: Hughes & Perfect
