= Talib Ahmed Bensouda =

Gambian politician

Hon. Talib Ahmed Bensouda
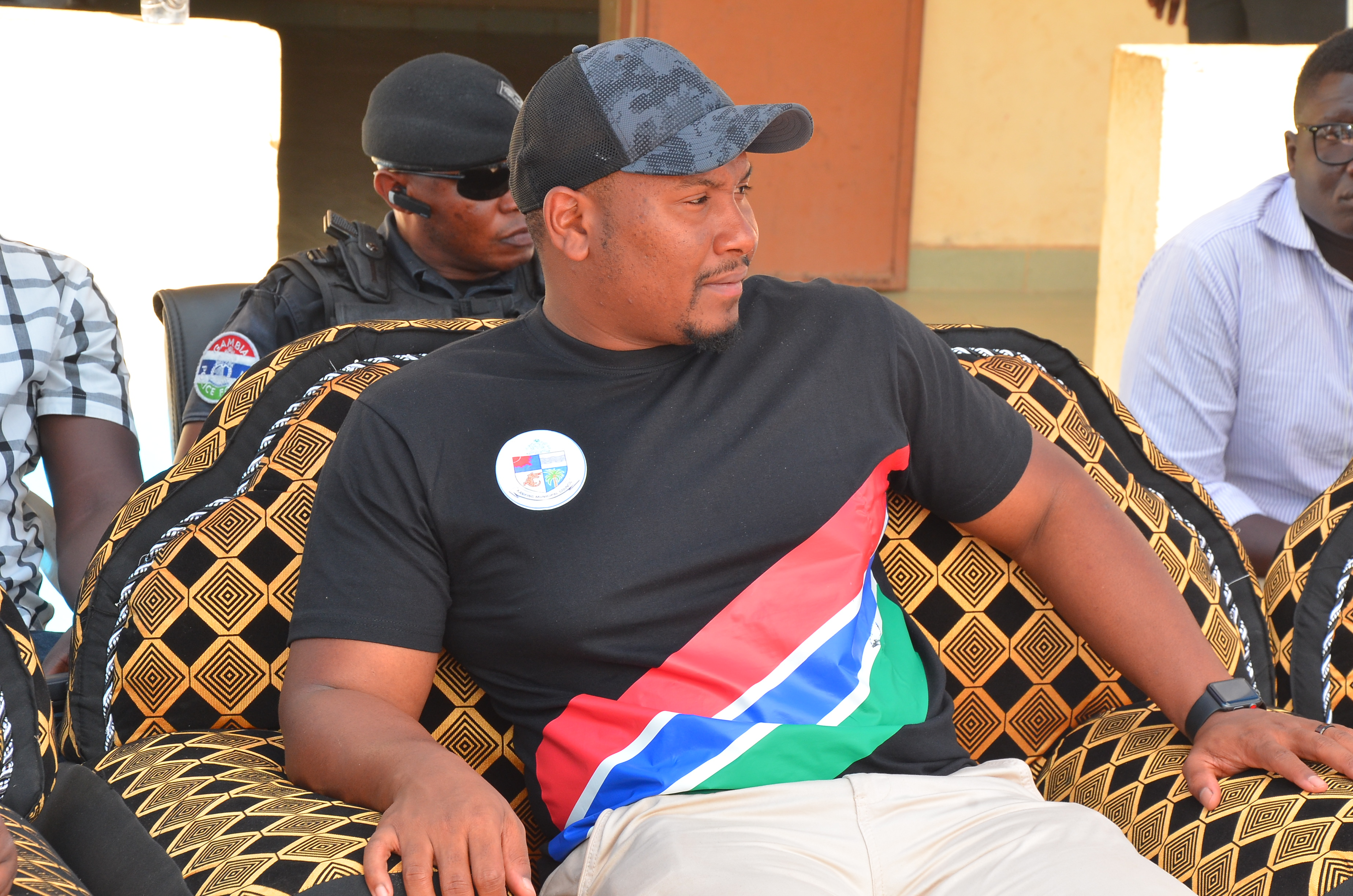

Mayor of Kanifing Municipal Council
- In office May 2018 – 6 November 2026
- Preceded by: Yankuba Colley

Personal details
- Born: 1986 (age 39–40) Bakau, The Gambia
- Party: UNITE (since 2026)
- Other political affiliations: United Democratic Party (until 2026)
- Education: University of Toronto
- Occupation: Politician

Talib Ahmed Bensouda (born in 1986) is a Gambian politician who has served as the mayor of the Kanifing Municipal Council (KMC) from 2018 to 2026. He is the founder and leader of the Unite for Nation, Integrity, Transformation and Equality (UNITE) political party in The Gambia.

== Early life and education ==
Talib Ahmed Bensouda was born in 1986 in Bakau. His father, Ahmed Bensouda, was a former permanent secretary in Dawda Jawara's regime and his mother is Amie Drammeh Bensouda. Talib attended Marina International School and graduated in 2003 upon completion of his IGCS. He later moved to Hamilton, Canada where he studied for a college diploma, and then moved to the city of Mississauga, where he enrolled in the University of Toronto to earn his Bachelor's degree in Economics and Communications Technology in 2007. He also completed his Insurance Foundation Diploma from the West African Insurance Institute in 2012.

== Career ==
Bensouda worked as an insurance salesperson with Grey Power Insurance in Canada. He also worked with 1-800-GOT-JUNK? as a sales lead. In 2010, he returned to the Gambia and was employed by Takaful Gambia Limited, an Islamic Insurance Institute as a marketing manager where he served as marketing manager until 2013. Between 2013 and 2018, Bensouda was engaged in various entrepreneurial ventures and community initiatives.

== Political career ==
=== Mayor of KMC (2018–2026) ===
Bensouda was first elected as the mayor of the Kanifing Municipal Council (KMC) in 2018. He contested under the United Democratic Party and received 29,325 votes. His closest rival, Rambo Jatta of the Alliance for Patriotic Reorientation and Construction (APRC) won 17,392.

Under Bensouda's mayorship, KMC launched the flagship Mbalit Project. The project reintroduced regular residential and commercial waste collection and operated a fleet of 24 new garbage trucks. The Council also implemented a zero waste strategy, fenced the Bakoteh dumpsite, and distributed hundreds of dustbins across KMC.

Bensouda was re-elected as the mayor of Kanifing Municipal Council at 2023 Gambian local elections, once again under the UDP ticket. He secured 56,094 votes, while his closest rival, Bakary Y. Badjie of the National People's Party, got 42,432 votes, and independent candidate Pa Modou Mbowe got 5,092 votes.

=== Presidential ambitions and split from the UDP ===
In 2024, it was alleged that Bensouda wished to defect to the ruling National People’s Party, an accusation Bensouda denied. In 2025, Bensouda entered the race to be flag-bearer of the UDP. In September 2025, he wished to be elected as the UDP's flag bearer for the 2026 Gambian presidential elections.

On 6 September 2025, Bensouda withdrew his candidacy for UDP flagbearership and resigned as the party’s National Organizing Secretary.

Shortly after his resignation, Bensouda launched his own party, the Unite Movement for Change (UMC). According to Bensouda, the new initiative aims to unite Gambians around the values of integrity, transformation, and inclusion ahead of the 2026 elections. The UMC held its inaugural congress on 17 May 2026. Bensouda was elected by delegates as the party's leader. Other members of the national executive were also elected. After the congress, the party held its first public rally at the Buffer Zone in the KMC.

The UMC applied for registration on 1 December 2025. It was officially registered as a political party by the Electoral Commission on 15 April 2026.

On 6 November 2026, Bensouda resigned from his post as mayor to focus on his bid in the 2026 Gambian presidential elections.

== Honours and recognition ==
Bensouda was honored by the Soninkara Youth Community in New York for his public service. In 2024, he was selected for France's PIPA (Future Leaders Invitation Programme).
