= 2023 Gambian local elections =

2023 local elections in the Gambia

Local elections were held in the Gambia on 20 May 2023. The elections took place following President Adama Barrow's re-election under the banner of the new National People's Party, and their subsequent victory in the 2022 parliamentary elections.

== Results ==
=== Total ===
The ruling National People's Party lost to the opposition United Democratic Party in urban areas while still winning in most rural areas.

Gambian local elections, 2023
Party	Votes	Mayors	Chairpeople
United Democratic Party	207,984	2	2
National People's Party	193,245	0	4
Gambia Democratic Congress			
People's Democratic Organisation for Independence and Socialism			
Independents	16,662	0	0
Total votes	417,891		
Registered voters	962,157		

=== Urban settlements ===
The United Democratic Party won all three urban local government areas, in Banjul, Brikama, and Kanifing. The National People's Party lost all but one councilor seat outside Brikama.

Banjul

Banjul mayoral election, 2023
Party	Candidate	Votes
United Democratic Party	Rohey Malick Lowe	8,299
National People's Party	Ebou Faye	6,992

Brikama

Brikama chairmanship election, 2023
Party	Candidate	Votes
United Democratic Party	Yankuba Darboe	77,946
National People's Party	Seedy Sheriff Ceesay	52,429
Independent	Ebrima J.S. Sanneh	24,558
	Amadou Gitteh	6,718
People's Progressive Party	Jainaba Bah	2,023
	Yankuba Barrow	1,341
	Bai Sey Jawo	1,183
	Amadou Mukhtar Cham	1,127
	Salieu Jallow	1,022

Kanifing

Kanifing mayoral election, 2023
Party	Candidate	Votes
United Democratic Party	Talib Ahmed Bensouda	56,094
National People's Party	Bakary Badjie	42,432
Independent	Pa Modo Mbowe	5,092

=== Rural settlements ===
The National People's Party won all but one rural elections.

Kerewan

Kerewan chairmanship election, 2023
Party	Candidate	Votes
National People's Party	Papa Tunkara	24,130
United Democratic Party	Malamin I.L. Bojang	22,572
Independent	Babou Kebbeh	2,475

Kuntaur

Kuntaur chairmanship election, 2023
Party	Candidate	Votes
National People's Party	Saihou Jawara	13,681
United Democratic Party	Alhagie SB Sillah	10,365
Gambia for All	Abdoulie Keita	1,227

Janjangbureh

Janjangbureh chairmanship election, 2023
Party	Candidate	Votes
National People's Party	Sulayman Sawaneh	11,924
United Democratic Party	Malick Sowe	8,225
Gambia Democratic Congress	Haruna Barry	2,614
Independent	Alhagie A. S. Boye	1,458

Lower River Region (Mansakonko)

The United Democratic Party won this seat.

Upper River Region (Basse)

Upper River Region chairmanship election, 2023
Party	Candidate	Votes
National People's Party	Mamadou Ceesay	28,902
United Democratic Party	Foday Danjo	8,947
People's Democratic Organization for Independence and Socialism	Karamo Touray	3,796
