= 2021 Gambian presidential election =

- 4 December 2021
- Registered: 962,157
- Turnout: 89.34%
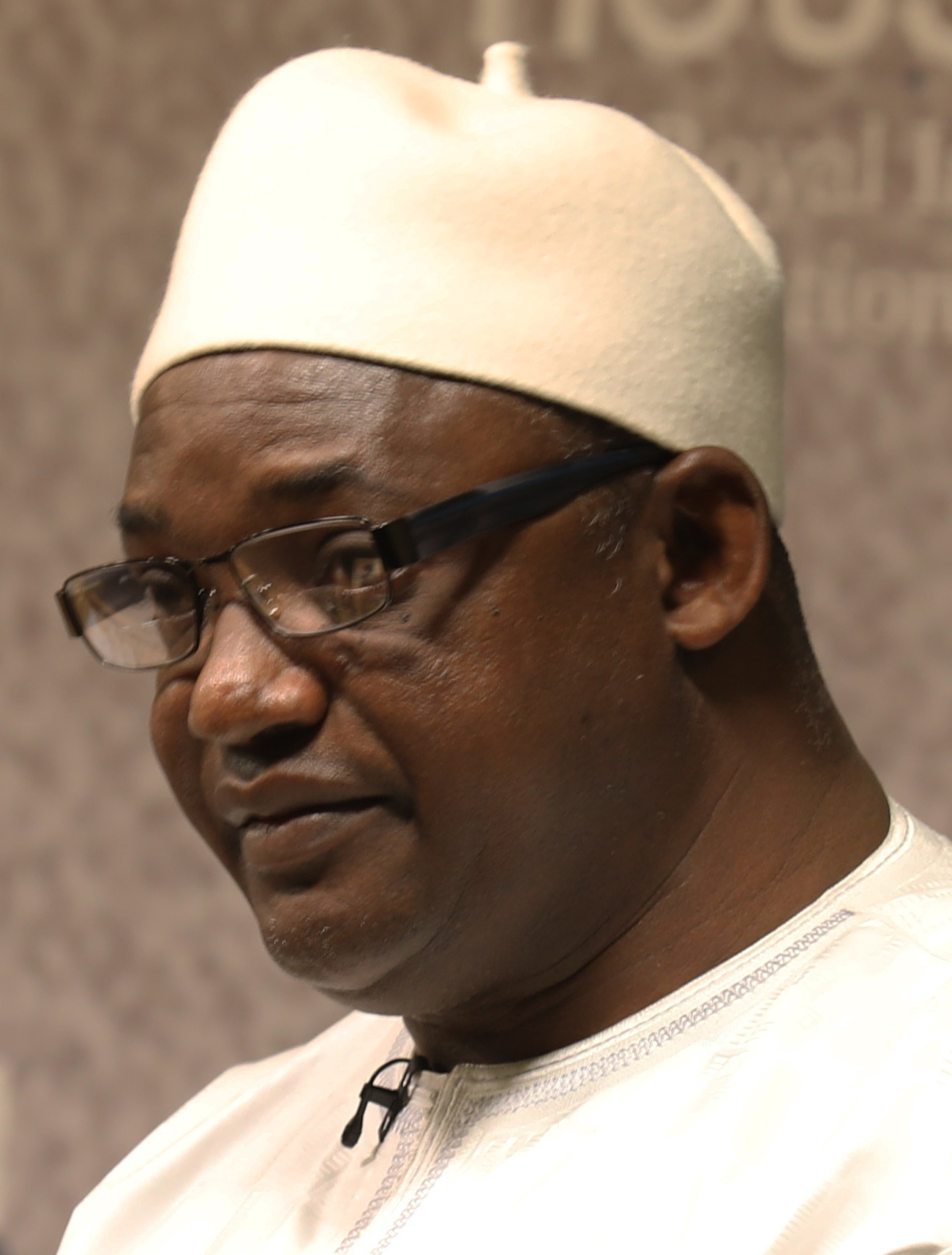

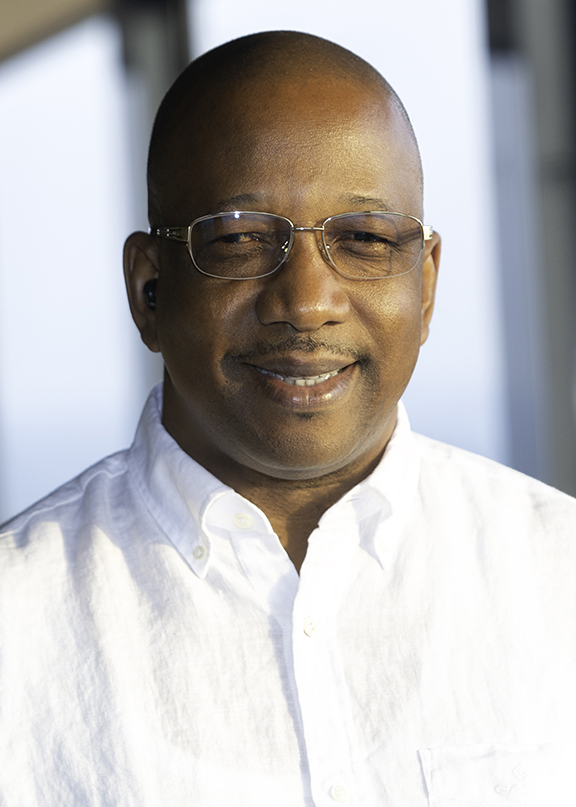
Nominee	Adama Barrow	Ousainou Darboe	Mama Kandeh
Party	NPP	UDP	GDC
Popular vote	457,519	238,253	105,902
Percentage	53.23%	27.72%	12.32%
President before election
Adama Barrow
NPP
Elected President
Adama Barrow
NPP

Presidential elections were held in the Gambia on 4 December 2021. The result was a victory for incumbent President Adama Barrow of the National People's Party, who received 53% of the vote, defeating five other candidates.

== Electoral system ==
The President of the Gambia is elected in a single round by first-past-the-post voting for a five-year term. Registered voters receive a voter's card which must be presented at the assigned polling station. After verifying eligibility, a polling officer marks the voter's left forefinger with indelible ink.

Instead of using paper ballots, elections in the Gambia are conducted using marbles. Each voter receives a marble and places it in a tube on top of a sealed drum that corresponds to that voter's favoured candidate. The drums for different candidates are painted in different colours corresponding to the party affiliation of the candidate, and a picture of the candidate is affixed to their corresponding drum. The drums are placed in the booth concealed from the officials to preserve ballot secrecy; the insertion of a marble rings a bell inside to signal that the vote has been cast. As a precaution against COVID-19, for this election sanitizer was provided at the entrances and exits of the booth.

During the tallying process, a candidate's drum is unsealed and its contents emptied in batches on hole boards with a capacity of 200 to 500 marbles each. Once the tellers agree on the number of marbles, the drum is refilled and retained for use in a recount, and the tellers pass to the next candidate's urn. This process, repeated in each polling station, is very fast; the results are generally known at the national level the day after the vote.

The system has the advantages of low cost and simplicity, both for understanding how to vote and for counting the results. The method is reported to have an extremely low error rate for miscast ballots.

== Background ==
In the 2016 presidential elections, Adama Barrow defeated the incumbent Yahya Jammeh who had been in power for over 20 years. Jammeh acknowledged defeat but then subsequently refused to step down as a result of voting miscount by the electoral commission, resulting in a constitutional crisis. Barrow eventually took office under ECOWAS intervention, with Jammeh fleeing to Equatorial Guinea where he remains in exile. Barrow had been a member of the United Democratic Party (UDP) and ran in 2016 as the presidential candidate of Coalition 2016, a collection of opposition groups seeking to unseat Jammeh.

In July 2018, the government began drafting a new constitution whose features would ensure a genuine separation of powers, limiting the presidency to a five-year term, renewable once, and introducing two-round voting instead of one. They had already voted to remove the constitutional age limit of 65 for presidents and vice-presidents. In accordance with the 1997 constitution, the draft constitution must first be approved by a qualified majority of three-quarters of parliamentarians before a possible referendum. The 58 members of the National Assembly, however, were divided on whether the new term limits were retroactive; Barrow could conceivably run for a third term if his first, begun under the previous constitution, was not taken into account. These dissensions caused a rift between Barrow and UDP leader Ousainou Darboe, who was then Vice-President. In a cabinet reshuffle on 15 February 2019, Barrow replaced Darboe and all UDP ministers; ten months later, he founded his own party, the National People's Party (NPP).

This rift between Barrow and the UDP drew attention to a previously-overlooked item in the Coalition 2016 manifesto. As the Coalition's immediate objective was to defeat Jammeh, its founding charter stipulated that Barrow would lead a provisional government, then withdraw to allow for an early presidential election where all opposition candidates except himself could have presented themselves under fully free and democratic conditions. An association of political parties and civil society organisations began large demonstrations in 2019 under the name "Three Years Jotna" (Jotna meaning "it is time" in Wolof) to insist that Barrow keep this promise. However, Barrow had now decided to serve out his term, and promised "serious consequences" to all those who supported the movement. 100 demonstrators were arrested, and the movement was officially banned.

After these events, the NPP members in the Assembly joined the party of former president Jammeh in opposing the new constitution. The draft was rejected in a second reading on 22 September 2020, with only 31 MPs voting for — 23 MPs against and 4 abstaining — far from the required majority of 44 votes.

Barrow received criticism from opposing parties and civil society for extending the stay of ECOMIG forces in Gambia as late as 2021. A 2021 survey conducted by CepRass for Afrobarometer showed 78% support for ending the mission and letting the national Armed Forces and Police take charge.

== Candidates ==
Nominations were accepted between 30 October and 5 November. From twenty-one nominees, six candidates were approved to run by the Independent Electoral Commission (IEC):

Name	Party	Position	Slogan	Manifesto
Adama Barrow	National People's Party	President of the Gambia (since 2017)	"Peace, Progress, and Unity"	
Ousainou Darboe	United Democratic Party	Former Vice President of the Gambia (2018–2019)	"Justice, Peace, and Progress"	
Essa M. Faal	Independent	Chief Prosecutor of the Truth, Reconciliation and Reparations Commission (since 2018)	"One Gambia, One Nation, One People"	
Mama Kandeh	Gambia Democratic Congress	MP in Pan-African Parliament	"One Gambia One people"	
Abdoulie Ebrima Jammeh	National Union Party	Former Director General of the Gambia Civil Aviation Authority	"Unity is strength"	
Halifa Sallah	People's Democratic Organisation for Independence and Socialism	Special Advisor to the President on Governance (2017); National Assembly Minority Leader (2002–2007)	"Liberty, dignity, and prosperity"	

== Opinion polls ==
For the first time, opinion polls were conducted prior to the election.

Pollster	Collection Dates	Sample size	Adama Barrow	Ousainou Darboe	Mama Kandeh	Halifa Sallah	Essa M. Faal	Abdoulie Ebrima Jammeh	Other/ Secret	Undecided/ abstention
CepRass	9–19 November 2021	1,185	41	22	6	5	3	<1	14	9
Candidates approved on 7 November 2021
CepRass	27 July–10 August 2021	969	29	13	4	4	—	—	10	40

== Campaign ==
Campaigning in this election was more open than in 2016, with many posters and campaign slogans. Voters did not hesitate to openly show their support for candidates, which contrasted with the restrictive environment under the previous regime. The economy was a concern for voters, due to the impact of the COVID-19 pandemic on the dominant tourism industry as well as the falling exchange rate of the Gambian dalasi.

For the first time, a debate was organised between presidential candidates. All six candidates were invited to participate on 20 November by the Committee for Political Debate, but only Halifa Sallah and Essa M. Faal attended.

Barrow's NPP announced a coalition with the party of former president Yahya Jammeh, the Alliance for Patriotic Reorientation and Reconstruction (APRC). Jammeh subsequently disavowed the alliance, saying it was done without his knowledge. This led to a split in the APRC between those who support the deal and are aligning with Barrow, and a "No Alliance Movement" loyal to Jammeh, who has remained strongly critical of Barrow. Jammeh then formally endorsed Kandeh, addressing his campaign rallies over the phone. The winner of the election would carry out the recommendations of the Truth, Reconciliation and Reparations Commission (TRRC); the commission submitted its report to Barrow on 25 November, but the report was not made public before the election.

Gambia Participates, a nonpartisan NGO, offers a free mobile app called Marble for tracking live election results from the IEC. The app was first released for the 2018 local elections. To promote voter engagement, staff members of the National Council for Civic Education (NCCE) toured the country and held public forums.

== Results ==
A total of 962,157 voters registered on the electoral lists, including 416,839 men and 545,318 women. 1,554 polling stations throughout the country were open on 4 December from 8:00 AM to 5:00 PM; voters in line at 5:00 PM were allowed to cast their vote.

President Barrow was declared the winner by the IEC on 5 December.

Candidate	Party	Votes	%
Adama Barrow	National People's Party	457,519	53.23
Ousainou Darboe	United Democratic Party	238,253	27.72
Mama Kandeh	Gambia Democratic Congress	105,902	12.32
Halifa Sallah	People's Democratic Organisation for Independence and Socialism	32,435	3.77
Essa M. Faal	Independent	17,206	2.00
Abdoulie Ebrima Jammeh	National Union Party	8,252	0.96
Total		859,567	100.00
Total votes		859,567	–
Registered voters/turnout		962,157	89.34
Source: IEC

== Reactions ==
Observers from the African Union stated that the electoral processes met international standards. European Union observers lauded the degree of transparency in voting and counting; however, they considered the candidate approval process to be somewhat opaque. Leading the Commonwealth observer group, Olusegun Obasanjo praised the marble voting system and the orderly conduct of the elections. Ernest Bai Koroma, head of the ECOWAS observer group, asked parties "to accept the outcome of the election in good faith."

President of Nigeria Muhammadu Buhari congratulated Barrow on re-election.

== Aftermath ==
Partial results were first released on 4 December showing Barrow in the lead. Darboe, Kandeh, and Faal subsequently issued a statement expressing doubts about the results due to delays at the polling stations. However, Sallah conceded. After Barrow was officially declared the victor the following day, Faal congratulated Barrow. Abdoulie Ebrima Jammeh also congratulated Barrow.

UDP members organised a protest in Banjul, leading Darboe to call for peace among Gambian citizens. On 14 December, the UDP formally appealed the election results to the Supreme Court, alleging that Barrow's campaign had engaged in vote buying and allowed foreigners to vote. The court dismissed the appeal on 28 December on procedural grounds, as the UDP had not served Barrow within five days of filing. Barrow was sworn in for a second term on 20 January.
