= 1947 Gambian parliamentary election =

Parliamentary elections were held in the Gambia in 1947 to elect the one elected member of the Legislative Council. It was the first time that the Council had had a directly elected representative.

== Background ==
In 1946 the Legislative Council was reorganised and increased in size from 11 to 14 members. It would consist of three ex-officio members, three officials, six appointees and one elected member.

== Results ==
The seat was won by Edward Francis Small, the founder of the Gambia Labour Union, who defeated I.M. Garba-Jahumpa (who later founded the Muslim Congress Party) and Sheikh Omar Fye.

Candidate	Votes	%
Edward Francis Small	1,491	46.67
Sheikh Omar Fye	1,018	31.86
I.M. Garba-Jahumpa	679	21.25
John Finden Dailey	4	0.13
Richard Rendall	3	0.09
Total	3,195	100.00
Registered voters/turnout	5,580	–
Source: Hughes & Perfect
