= April 2000 Gambian student massacre =

- Location: Banjul, The Gambia
- Date: 10 April 2000
- Deaths: 15
- Injuries: 80+, 28 critical
- Victims: 14 students, one Red Cross volunteer, one child
- Perpetrators: Gambian police officers and soldiers
- Inquiry: Lartey Commission
- Website: www.april1011gambia.org

The April 2000 Gambian student massacre was the killing of 14 people (and one accidental death) by Gambian police officers and soldiers on the 10 April 2000 at a student protest in Banjul, the Gambia. The protest had been called following two separate incidents - the beating to death of secondary school student Ebrima Barry by firefighters, and the rape of a 13-year-old girl by a uniformed police officer - and the lack of investigation of both of those incidents. Despite firing live ammunition into the protesters after government buildings had been damaged, no charges have been brought against those involved, and the Yahya Jammeh government suppressed commemoration of the event. Adama Barrow's government has since promised to investigate the shooting.

== Background ==
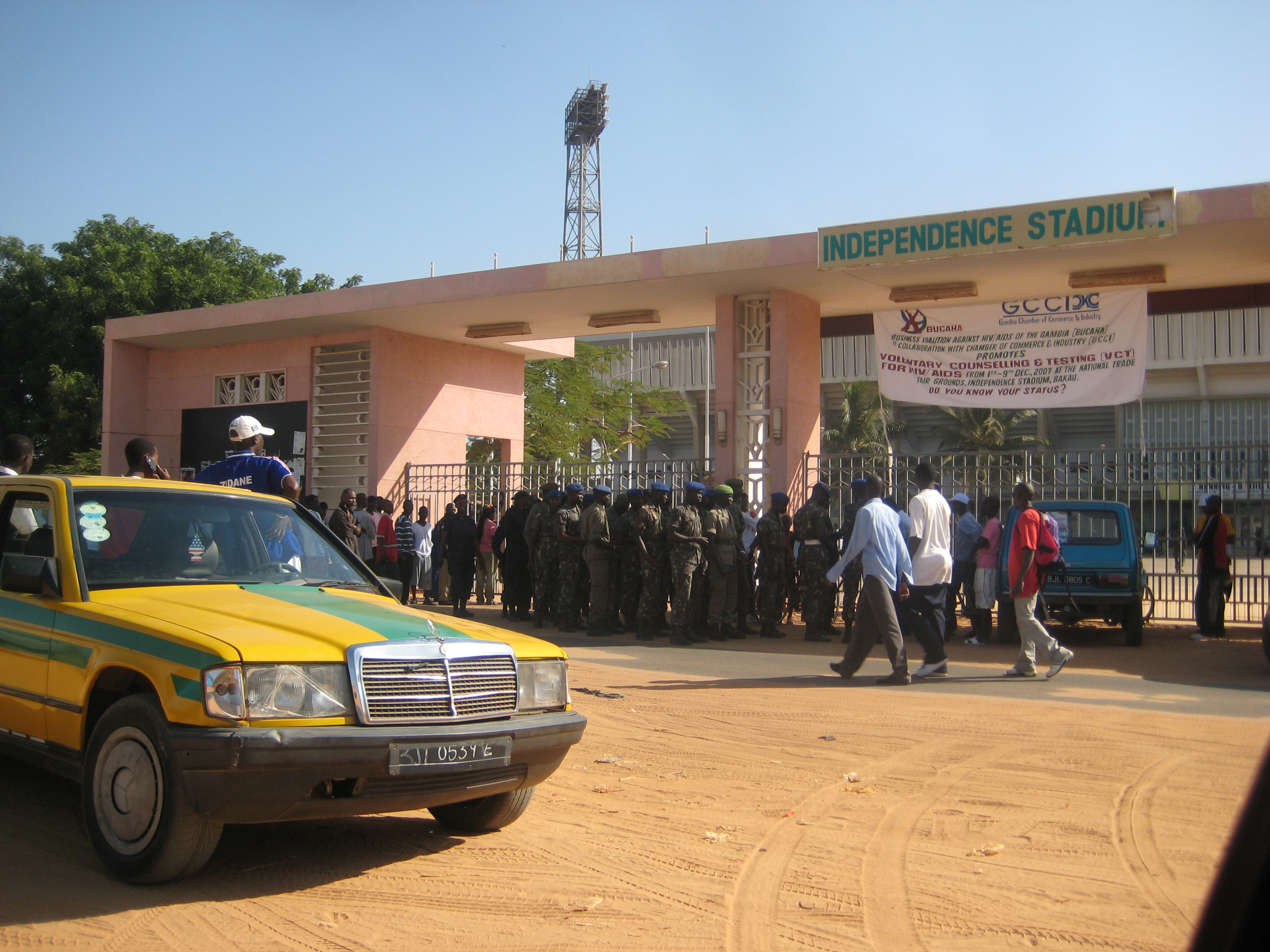
The entrance to Independence Stadium, where the alleged rape took place.

On 8 March 2000, 19-year-old secondary school student Ebrima Barry was murdered by firefighters in Brikama, West Coast Division. Barry's teacher, a Mr Paul, had called firefighters to the school after Barry had insulted him, in order to remove Barry from the classroom, as he was afraid of a physical altercation. However, the firefighters not only removed him from the school but took him to their station where they shaved his head, beat him, forced him to carry heavy bags of cement, stripped him naked, poured cement on him and finally put cement in his mouth and forced him to swallow it. He was able to get home that night but died the next day from his injuries. Later in the week, students from Barry's secondary school converged on the local fire station in protest but were dispersed by police officers.

The government failed to investigate the matter, leading to the Gambia Student Union (GAMSU) leadership calling for an inquiry. The government, besides expressing surprise that firefighters had been asked to discipline a student, made no further move to investigate the matter. An autopsy report was released which stated that Barry had died of natural causes. The report was widely perceived to be a cover-up. A spontaneous protest ensued at The Gambia College, where GAMSU was active, as well as at other schools. The courts eventually charged seven firefighters with participating in Barry's death, but all seven were acquitted on 2 March 2001.

Concurrently with the developments surrounding Barry's murder, a 13-year-old girl, known in the press as Binta, was allegedly raped by a uniformed paramilitary police officer (part of the Police Intervention Unit) at the Independence Stadium during an inter-schools sports competition. A medical examination confirmed that the girl had been raped, and GAMSU again pressed the government for answers, calling for the girl to be allowed to identify the rapist. Following a long delay in any government action, GAMSU requested a police permit to hold a public protest. The request was denied, but, referring to their constitutional right to protest, GAMSU called its members to take part in a peaceful march towards the capital city of Banjul.

== Incident ==
GAMSU decided to hold their protest march on 10 April 2000, and 'thousands' reportedly gathered outside the Gambia Technical Training Institute intending to march towards the Banjul city centre. However, they were stopped by police officers, who ordered them to disperse. Refusing to do so, the police opened fire on the protest with tear gas and rubber bullets. The students then scattered but regrouped, creating barricades out of burning tires and throwing stones at the police. As non-students then joined the fray, government buildings were attacked and a police station was set on fire.

The police then reacted by opening fire on the protesters with live ammunition. They killed 16 people, 14 of whom were students, as well as a journalist and Red Cross volunteer, Omar Barrow, and a three-year-old child. Hundreds were reported to have been injured. Immediately following the shooting, people were barred by the police from entering the local hospital to identify the dead. A statement released by the President's office following the shooting stated that 28 people had been admitted to Royal Victoria Teaching Hospital. A student nurse drafted in to help during the massacre later described how there was "immediate chaos in the hospital" and how during emergency operations on gunshot wounds, radio stations were saying that only rubber bullets had been used.

=== Victims ===
The full list of those killed is as follows. Further details are those from a coroner's inquest published by Foroyaa in 2014.

- Reginald Carroll, student of La Fourmi Institute, died of gunshot wounds
- Karamo Barrow, former student of the Institute for Continuing Education, died of gunshot wounds
- Lamin Bojang, student of Nusrat Senior Secondary School, died of gunshot wounds
- Ousman Sabally, student of Brikamaba Upper Basic School, died of gunshot wounds
- Sainey Nyabally, not mentioned in report
- Ousman Sembene, not mentioned in report
- Bakary Njie, not mentioned in report
- Claesco Pierra, resident of New Jeshwang, died of gunshot wounds
- Momodou Lamin Njie, student of Gambia Technical Training Institute, died of gunshot wounds
- Wuyea Foday Mansareh, student of Tallinding Islamic Institute, died of gunshot wounds
- Bamba Jobarteh, not mentioned in report
- Momodou Lamin Chune, student of Latrikunda Middle School, died of gunshot wounds
- Abdoulie Sanyang, from Old Jeshwang, died from accidental trampling
- Babucarr Badjie, 10-year-old student, died of gunshot wounds
- Omar Barrow, journalist and Red Cross volunteer, died of gunshot wounds

== Aftermath ==
=== Government response ===
Following the shooting, the government denied allegations that President Yahya Jammeh had given the order to shoot the students. During the crisis, he had been away in Cuba for a summit of the Group of 77. Instead, they issued a statement that blamed student leaders and closed all schools for several days. The statement said: "There is no doubt that the crisis was incited by the Gambia Students Union and aggravated by some bad elements and bandits who took advantage of the situation, disguising themselves as students and encouraging the crowd of so-called demonstrators to the damage."

Later, the vice-president, Isatou Njie-Saidy, claimed that the students "killed themselves", having broken into police armouries and shot each other with stolen weapons. Also, following the incident, families of the victims were in no way compensated by the government and commemoration events were banned for the rest of Jammeh's presidency, until 2017. A subsequent government commission of inquiry, under Chief Justice Felix Lartey, concluded that Police Intervention Unit (PIU) officers were "largely responsible" for carrying out the shooting. On 26 January 2001, the government announced that it disagreed with the commission's recommendations and that nobody would be prosecuted.

On 18 April, the National Assembly approved an Indemnity Bill that backdated to January 2000 and amended the Indemnity Act of 1982, allowing Jammeh to indemnify anyone "for the purpose of promoting reconciliation in an appropriate case." Jammeh signed the bill in May. In essence, it prevented the families of those killed from seeking redress in the courts. Hawa Sisay-Sabally has since described the act as "tantamount to a coup against the 1997 constitution" and it has been widely criticised.

=== Further protests ===
Following the shooting, students in the country's only boarding school and several other rural towns across the Gambia launched their own protests on 11 April. Like their colleagues in Banjul, they were violently suppressed and hundreds of students were detained across the country.

As the protests subsided, GAMSU and other human rights groups in the Gambia, including the Gambian branch of Amnesty International, formed a larger group called the Coalition of Human Rights Defenders. This group was able to eventually free all those arrested on 10 and 11 April as well as increasing international awareness of the incident.

== Legacy ==
It has been suggested that one of the primary motivations behind the 2014 Gambian coup d'état attempt was the student massacre 14 years earlier.

The first proper commemoration of the event took place 17 years after it happened, in April 2017. Organised by the April 10/11 Memorial Foundation a march was held followed by a symposium (http://www.april1011gambia.org/) Speaking there, Attorney General and Minister of Justice Ba Tambadou said that justice should prevail for the victims and families of those killed. He said that the Barrow government would try everything in its power to find out who gave the order to shoot the protesters and bring them to justice.
