= Baba Galleh Jallow =

Gambian academic and journalist

- Born: Farafenni, The Gambia
- Occupations: Journalist, academic

Academic background
- Education: Fourah Bay College; Rutgers University; University of California, Davis

Academic work
- Institutions: Creighton University; La Salle University
- Main interests: African history
- Notable works: Defying Dictatorship

Baba Galleh Jallow is a Gambian academic and journalist who was appointed as executive secretary of the Truth, Reconciliation and Reparations Commission (TRRC) in February 2018.

Born in Farafenni, Jallow completed his undergraduate studies at the University of Sierra Leone. He became a journalist, and was appointed as assistant editor of The Daily Observer in 1994, following the coup d'etat. He became editor-in-chief, and fought against the odds to maintain the paper's independence during the first years of the Yahya Jammeh regime. He resigned in 1999 when new owners threatened its independence, and he founded The Independent shortly after. As its editor, Jallow took very strong stances against the regime, especially regarding the April 2000 Gambian student massacre. He was a constant target of harassment from government forces, and was in such danger that he was forced into exile in the United States in September 2000.

Jallow completed a master's degree at Rutgers University and a PhD at the University of California, Davis, in African history. He lectured at Creighton University, Nebraska, from 2011 to 2015, before becoming an assistant professor at La Salle University, Pennsylvania. He has published a number of academic books on African history, especially leadership, politics, social justice, and Catholics in Africa. He began working as a visiting professor at the University of The Gambia in 2017, and took a two-year leave of absence from La Salle following his appointment to the TRRC in 2018.

== Early life ==
Jallow was born in Farafenni, and nearly dropped out of school growing up. He attended Armitage High School and Gambia High School and completed his undergraduate studies at Fourah Bay College, University of Sierra Leone.

== Journalistic career ==
After graduating from Fourah Bay College, Jallow worked for the National Council for Arts and Culture as a research assistant, and then the West African Examinations Council (WAEC) as an assistant registrar. During his time at the WAEC, Jallow began writing a short story column for The Daily Observer, called 'Story of the Week'. One week after the 1994 coup d'etat, in which army officer Yahya Jammeh seized power from elected president Dawda Jawara, Jallow left his job at the WAEC and was appointed assistant editor of the Observer by Kenneth Best.

=== The Daily Observer ===
Jallow subsequently became editor-in-chief of the paper. He maintained a strong independent editorial policy at the paper, which led to him being arrested multiple times by the police and the National Intelligence Agency (NIA). Immigration officers were stationed at the entrance to the paper's building to check the papers of everyone who came in. During this time, it became clear the paper would not survive for very long, so Jallow developed the idea for a new independent paper, The Independent.

Jallow resigned in 1999 shortly after the paper was bought by Amadou Samba, a close friend of Jammeh. Jallow was offered to stay on as editor-in-chief, but he was told that the paper's news editor, Demba Ali Jawo, was going to be sacked, and Jallow suspected this was related to critical comments he had made about Jammeh's regime in his weekly column. Jallow told that management that he would not edit a paper that fired journalists due to their opinions, and so when Jawo was fired, the next day Jallow submitted his resignation.

=== The Independent ===
After leaving the Observer, Jallow founded The Independent. Compared to other private newspapers such as The Point and Foroyaa, Jallow said "I think we were probably more reckless, if you like, in our brand of independent journalism." The paper had the motto 'Truth is our Principle', and was known for its "hard-hitting" editorials. Within three weeks of being published, the paper was forced to close for 'failure to register'. After formally registering, the paper resumed publication, but the NIA and police continued their harassment. On one occasion, all of the paper's staff were taken into waiting vehicles and detained briefly at the NIA headquarters. The paper was petrol-bombed twice, and its new Heidelberg press was burnt to the ground by Jammeh sympathisers.

The paper reported extensively on the April 2000 Gambian student massacre and published a number of strongly-worded editorials about the incident, and the paper continued its firm stance after the report of the commission of inquiry. Shortly after, the government claimed Jallow was not Gambian, and immigration officers interrogated him and his parents, who ID cards were permanently seized. Jallow heard from a government source that they were planning on deporting him to an unknown country. With concerns about his own safety, Jallow applied to the US Embassy for a visa and he left for the United States in September 2000.

== Academic career ==
After regularising his immigration status in the United States, Jallow was accepted onto the master's program in Liberal Studies at the Camden campus of Rutgers University in New Jersey. He graduated from this in May 2005, and was accepted onto the doctoral program in African Studies at Howard University. A year later, he transferred to the same program at the University of California, Davis, from which he graduated in 2011. He taught African History at Creighton University in Nebraska for four years. In 2015, he became an assistant professor at La Salle University in Pennsylvania. In 2017, Jallow was appointed as a visiting professor at the University of The Gambia, teaching the master's degree program in African History.

As an academic, his research interests have been the history of colonial and postcolonial Africa, censorship, press freedom, and state formation in Africa. He has also researched Catholics and social justice in Africa. He has published a number of books on leadership and politics. Jallow has published a number of academic books, and academic articles, including in the Vienna Journal of African Studies, the Journal of Asian and African Studies, Interventions, the Journal of Critical Southern Studies, and the Journal of Religion and Society. He also published a collection of essays about Gambian politics, called Defying Dictatorship, in 2017.

== Truth, Reconciliation and Reparations Commission ==
In February 2018, it was announced that Jallow had been appointed as executive secretary of the Truth, Reconciliation and Reparations Commission. He was granted a two-year leave of absence from La Salle and was formally sworn-in at a ceremony at the State House on 1 March. Following the Faraba shooting, Jallow published an open letter to President Adama Barrow, imploring justice for the victims.
