= Momodou Jallow =

Gambian trade union leader and politician

Momodou Ebrima Jallow (15 January 1928 – 23 May 1987) was a Gambian trade union leader and politician.

Born in Janjanbureh (then known as "Georgetown"), Jallow was educated at St Augustine's School in Banjul. In 1949, he began working as a clerk in the civil service, then in 1954 won a scholarship to undertake a short course at the Federal Cooperative College in Ibadan. In 1955, he was convicted of theft from a co-operative society, and was dismissed from the civil service.

Out of employment, Jallow founded a trade union, the Gambia Construction Employees' Society, which soon became the Gambia Workers' Union (GWU), with Jallow serving as general secretary. The following year, it briefly merged with the Gambia Labour Union, but this venture failed. However, the union steadily grew, with Jallow negotiating favourable contracts with several companies, and attended a four-month course on trade unionism organised by the International Confederation of Free Trade Unions (ICFTU) in Kampala.

In 1960, Jallow led general strike which secured an increase in the minimum wage and the formation of joint industrial councils. He called a further general strike in 1961, during which the British authorities arrested him, increasing his prominence. On release, he was invited to join constitutional talks in London.

In 1964, Jallow was elected as the first general secretary of the ICFTU African Regional Organisation and moved to Lagos. However, he embezzled the organisation's funds and was fired in 1965. He returned to the Gambia and resumed his work with the GWU. He stood as an independent in the 1966 Gambian general election, and again in 1972, but was defeated on both occasions. The GWU struggled until a general strike in 1975 led to wage increases, but a further general strike in 1976 failed, and the union was banned the following year.

Jallow strongly opposed the 1981 Gambian coup attempt and supported the formation of the Senegambia Confederation, which led the government to briefly legalise the GWU. In 1985, he was instead appointed as general secretary of the new Gambia Workers' Confederation. In 1987, he was appointed to Parliament as a representative of labour, but he died two weeks later.

Trade union offices
| Preceded by New position | General Secretary of the ICFTU African Regional Organisation; 1964–1965 | Succeeded by Post vacant |
| Preceded by Federation founded | General Secretary of the Gambia Workers' Confederation; 1985–1987 | Succeeded by Pa Moudo Faal |
