= Abdoulie Janneh =

Gambian diplomat

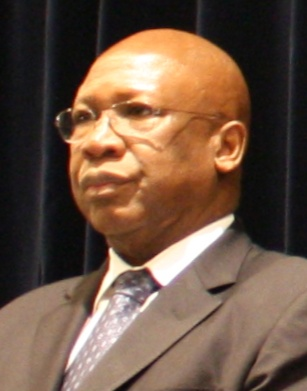
Janneh in 2009

Abdoulie Janneh is a Gambian diplomat and economist. He served as executive secretary of the UN Economic Commission for Africa from 2005 to 2012. Since leaving the UN, he has worked as executive director of the Mo Ibrahim Foundation. In 2018, he was appointed as chairperson of commissioners of the Gambian Truth, Reconciliation and Reparations Commission (TRRC).

== Education ==
Janneh studied engineering science at Fourah Bay College, University of Sierra Leone, and completed a master's degree in urban and regional planning studies at the University of Nottingham. He has also completed postgraduate studies in project planning and appraisal at the University of Bradford.

== Career ==
Janneh became deputy executive secretary of the UN Capital Development Fund in 1990. In 1993, he was moved to become resident coordinator of the UN Development Programme (UNDP) in Niger, and in 1996 he moved to do the same role in Ghana. In June 2000, Janneh became the UNDP Regional Director for Africa, serving until October 2005. In that capacity, he managed the UNDP's largest Regional Bureau, covering 45 countries and overseeing 1,500 staff. This role was at the level of Assistant Secretary-General of the United Nations,

Under his guidance, the UNDP Bureau for Africa has contributed greatly to promoting good governance, the fight against HIV/AIDs, economic reform, fair trade, poverty eradication and crisis prevention. He also pays special attention to issues such as the institutional transformation of the African Union and the successful implementation of the New Partnership for Africa's Development (NEPAD). He has played a critical role in strategy and policy-setting in UNDP and has spearheaded institutional change and development in the organization. In 1999, he led the Transition Team of the former UNDP Administrator, Mark Malloch Brown.

From 2000 to 2005, Janneh served as Assistant Secretary-General and UNDP Regional Director for Africa, in charge of managing UNDP's largest Regional Bureau, covering 45 countries in sub-Saharan Africa with a complement of over 1,500 staff. He was the Under-Secretary-General and Executive Secretary of the United Nations Economic Commission for Africa (ECA) from 2005 to 2012. He currently serves as executive director and liaison with Governments and Institutions in Africa on the board of the Mo Ibrahim Foundation.

== Other activities ==
- Africa Europe Foundation (AEF), Member of the High-Level Group of Personalities on Africa-Europe Relations (since 2020)
