= Gambia National Party =

Political party in the Gambia

The Gambia National Party (abbreviated NP) was a political party in Gambia. It was formed in 1958 by a group calling itself the Committee of Gentlemen, a grouping of young radicals in Bathurst. The 'Committee of Gentlemen' had four members, included Melville Senami Benoni Jones (returned from Ghana, journalist by profession), Edrissa J. Samba (businessman), Alexander Jobarteh (businessman) and Kebba Wally Foon (Labour Party supporter whilst a student in England, accountant by profession), with businessman and philanthropist John W. Bidwell-Bright sponsoring the group economically.

Unlike other contemporary Gambian political parties, the National Party had an ideological doctrine and was not just a platform for a single politician. The party was anti-racist and anti-colonial. It drew inspiration from Nkrumah's Ghana. Foon served as the party president. The party held weekly meetings at Fitzgerald Street.

The party published the newspaper The Vanguard. Launched in 1958, The Vanguard became defunct in 1960.

NP was represented at the 1958 All-Party Conference by Foon and Jones, with Foon serving as the secretary of the All-Party Conference. NP called for extension of universal suffrage to the Gambia Protectorate. NP opposed the proposals from the 1958 Chiefs Conference, as the Protectorate chief wanted ministries to be earmarked for the Protectorate, blocking political parties from operating there and excluding women from politics.

Henry J. Joof and K.W. Foon represented NP at the 1959 Bathurst Constitutional Conference, convened by the governor.

By the time the Gambia (Constitution) Order in Council, 1960 was published, NP had divided in two camps. The pro-Democratic Party wing of NP joined the Committee of Citizens and protested against the order. The anti-DP wing of NP stayed away from this campaign. NP became defunct as of early 1960.
