= I. M. Garba-Jahumpa =

Gambian politician (1912–1994)

Ibrihima Momodou Garba-Jahumpa

Personal details
- Born: Ibrahima Momodou Garba-Jahumpa; 22 November 1912 Bathurst, The Gambia
- Died: 4 September 1994 (aged 81) Banjul

Ibrahima Muhammadu/Momodou Garba-Jahumpa (22 November 1912 – 4 September 1994) was a Gambian trade union leader and politician who served as the Minister of Agriculture, Minister for Health and Minister for Finance.

== Early life and education ==
Ibrahima Momodou Garba-Jahumpa was born on 22 November 1912, in Bathurst (now Banjul), the Gambia, into a Muslim Wolof family. He was the son of Momodu Jahumpa. He began his education at the Mohammedan School in Bathurst (1925–1930). He earned a government scholarship to St. Augustine's Secondary School.

== Early career and trade unionism ==
Garba-Jahumpa initially worked as a commercial clerk (1933–1935) before obtaining his teaching certificate in 1936. He then taught at Mohammedan School until 1944. His political career began under the patronage of Edward Francis Small, a prominent Gambian trade unionist and activist. He was appointed Assistant Secretary of the Rate Payers’ Association in 1935 and served as Secretary of the Gambia Labour Union (GLU) from 1942 to 1945. In 1945, he accompanied Small to the World Trade Union Conference in London.

== Life and political career ==
As a teacher in the 1930s Ibrahima taught Dawda Jawara at Bathurst's Mohammedan School.

Ibrahima's political journey began in 1942 as a nominated member of the municipal council, with his success a result of his connection to the Muslim population.

During his formative years, Ibrahima embarked on his political apprenticeship and trade unionism under the guidance of Edward Francis Small, who is widely regarded as the father of Gambian trade unionism. Small took Ibrahima to the 1945 World International Trade Union Conference in London, where he had the opportunity to meet influential African leaders such as Jomo Kenyatta and Kwame Nkrumah. Ibrahima also participated in the Fifth Pan-African Congress held in Manchester, representing the Gambia Labour Union which he was Secretary, which was a significant point in his life.

Ibrahima's interest in trade unionism has been noted as relating to the opportunities in politics it would provide, and was criticised as not serving the labour once appointed.

In May 1946, Ibrahima played a pivotal role in reviving the Bathurst Young Muslims Society (BYMS). He also ran as a candidate in his home area of Half Die during the 1946 election and was elected as one of three BYMS candidates to the Bathurst Town Council (BTC), a seat he held almost continuously until 1968. In 1959, he became the first Gambian to assume the position of Chairman (now known as Mayor) of the BTC. Simultaneously, he continued work as a tutor at the Teachers' Training College in Georgetown from 1949 to 1950 and served as the headmaster of Bakau School from 1950 to 1951.

In 1951, Ibrahima founded and led the Gambia Muslim Congress and was elected to the Legislative Council of the Gambia, alongside John Colley Faye and Henri Madi. He was re-elected in 1954 and subsequently appointed the Minister of Agriculture, a position he held until his defeat in the 1960 elections.

Despite facing political isolation in the late 1950s, Ibrahima's fortunes changed in 1959 when he became Secretary General as the Muslim Congress Party and the Democratic Party merged to form the Democratic Congress Alliance (DCA) shortly before the 1960 general election. As the secretary-general of the DCA, Ibrahima contested the Half Die constituency but narrowly lost the United Party.

He attended the Constitutional Conference in 1961 for The Gambia's independence, and subsequently was present at Marlborough House, London, as the Gambia Independence Act 1964 was signed, before its independence on 18 February 1965.

In 1965, Ibrahima aligned himself with the United Party to successfully oppose the republic referendum, campaigning against Dawda Jawara's alleged intention to merge with Senegal's Léopold Sédar Senghor and create the Senegambia Confederation.

Finally, in the 1966 election, Ibrahima was elected to the House of Representatives, representing Bathurst South (Half Die). However, in a surprising turn of events in March 1968, he disbanded the GCP and joined Dawda Jawara's People's Progressive Party. This decision proved fruitful as he was appointed the Minister of Health. Ibrahima successfully retained the Banjul South seat in the 1972 general election and was subsequently promoted to Minister of Finance a few months later. However, his political journey came to an end with his electoral defeat in the 1977 general election.

He died in Banjul on 4 September 1994.

== Personal life ==
He is referenced as part of the Wolof people. His son, Bala Garba Jahumpa, also went on for a career in politics.

His daughter Fatoumata Jahumpa Ceesay, also pursued a career in politics.

He has a street named after him in Bakau New Town, Banjul.
