= Half Die =

Area of Banjul, The Gambia

Coordinates: 13°26′43″N 16°34′31″W

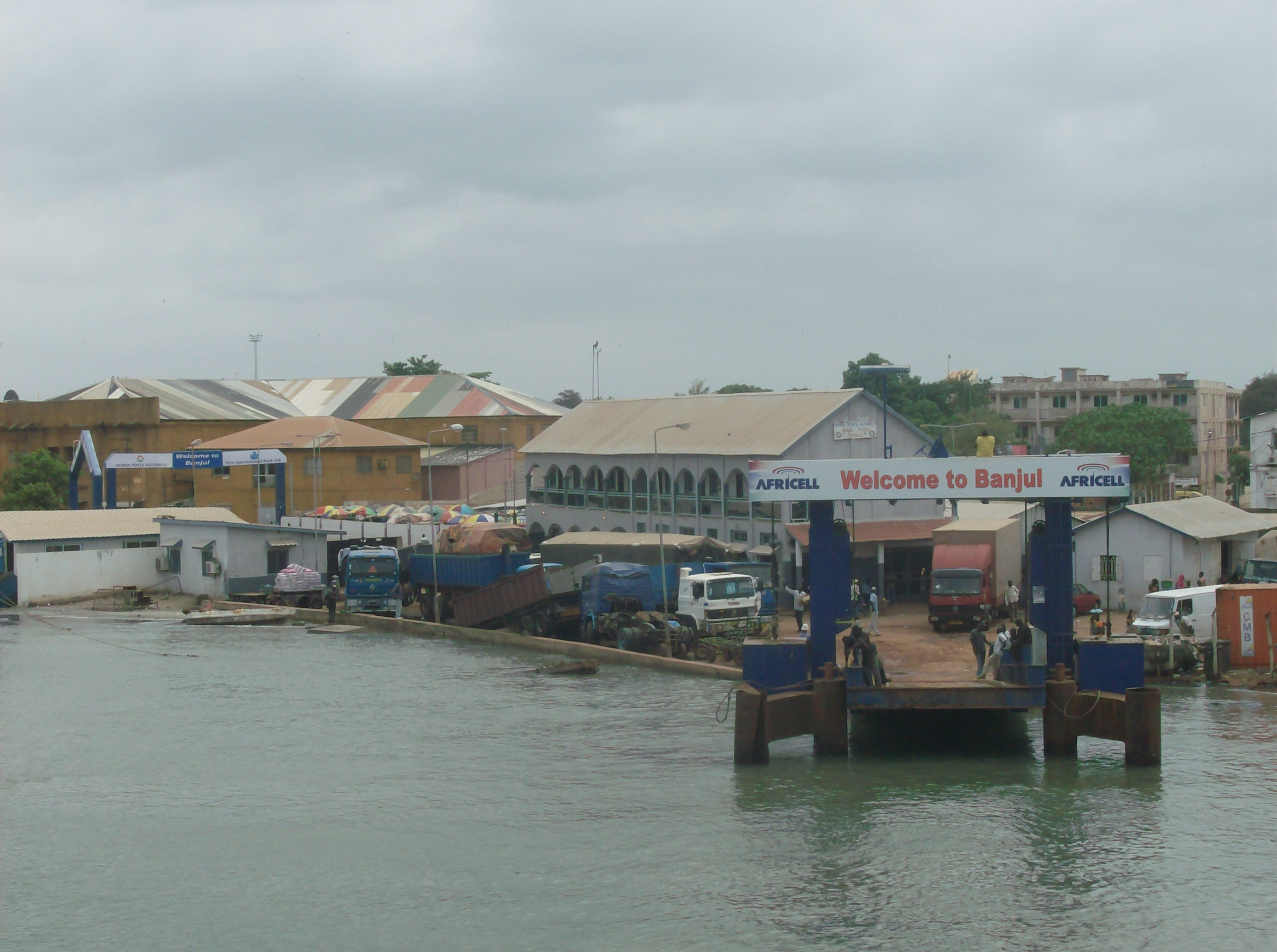
The Banjul Ferry Terminal, located in Half Die

Half Die (known as Bathurst during the colonial era) is an area within Banjul, the capital of The Gambia. It was also known as Mocam Town, Moka Town, or Wildman Town. During the colonial period the area was noted for being flooded repeatedly, and was the home to the poorer sections of the city.

Built on a sand pit at the south-eastern fringe of St. Mary's Island, Mocam Town emerged as one of the villages formed during the tenure of Alexander Grant as Commandant of St. Mary's Island, as Grant outlined a system whereby different ethnic communities would have a separate village on the island. Mocam Town was the first Aku settlement, before the Akus started shifting to New Town (later known as 'Banjul Central'). Mocam Town was bordered by Jolof Town, a settlement of Wolof people from Goree Island. Eventually the vacant spaces between the villages become occupied, gradually merging into a single urban area. Mocam Town received migrants from Kombo and upriver, seeking work opportunities in the colonial capital.

The name Half Die is said to originate from high mortality among its residents, attributed to the 1837 yellow fever outbreak or the 1869 cholera epidemic. One account attributes the name to a conversation between Lieutenant Governor of the Gambia George Rendall and the then colonial surgeon during the 1837 yellow fever outbreak. During the 1869 cholera outbreak in Mocam Town, 1,162 out of about 4,000 inhabitants of Bathurst died.

George Abbas Kooli D'Arcy, the governor of the Gambia, who had begun his tenure in the midst of a yellow fever outbreak in 1859, sought to improve the sanitary situation in the area by raising the land, but he failed to get the support from the British government at the time. In the early 20th century measures were taken to mitigate floods during rainy season.

Politically, from the 1950s to the 1970s Half Die was the stronghold of Ibrahim Muhammadu Garba-Jahumpa. In 1966 Half Die was included in the Bathurst South Parliamentary Constituency.
