= 2014 Gambian coup attempt =

2014 coup attempt in The Gambia

2014 Gambian coup d'état attempt
| Date | 30 December 2014 |
| Location | Banjul, The Gambia |
| Result | Coup failure |

Belligerents
| (The Gambia) Gambian Government: Military of the Gambia | Faction of the Presidential Guard |

Commanders and leaders
| President Yahya Jammeh | Lt. Col. Lamin Sanneh † |

Casualties and losses
- 4 deaths, several wounded

The 2014 Gambian coup d'état attempt was a coup led by American–Gambian nationals with the intent to overthrow President Yahya Jammeh. It broke out during the night of 30 December 2014, when gunfire erupted in the capital of Banjul.

== Background ==
At the time of the coup attempt President Yahya Jammeh was out of the country, with sources differing on whether he was in France or Dubai. Jammeh, who himself came to power in the 1994 Gambian coup d'état, had experienced several attempted coups against his regime, and sometimes accused the United Kingdom and the United States of being behind said attempts. Previously in November 2014, Jammeh condemned the European Union for its response to increasingly harsh anti-LGBT discrimination under his government. The following month those same measures caused the United States to drop The Gambia from one of its trade programmes.

=== Perpetuators ===
Lieutenant Colonel Lamin Sanneh earned a masters degree at the National Defense University in Washington D.C. He was eventually chosen to be the commander of the Presidential Guard in The Gambia.

Njaga Jagne moved to the United States in 1993 and was deployed twice to Iraq. He received expedited citizenship in the United States in 2006, on account of his military service. After returning, he worked for the Yellow Ribbon Reintegration Program. At the time of the coup, he was a captain in the 149th infantry battalion of the Kentucky National Guard.

Cherno Nije graduated from University of Texas at Austin in 1987 with a bachelor’s in government. He specialized in tax credits at the Texas Department of Housing and Community Affairs. He later founded Songhai Development, an affordable housing development agency.

Banka Manneh came to the United States in 1995 to pursue his bachelor's degree. He worked with Sigga Jagne—Njaga Jagne's sister. Njaga Jagne also participated in a Gambian politics Facebook group which Manneh started.

=== Planning ===
Njaga Jagne became increasingly vocal about his distaste for President Jammeh. In October 2013, Jagne posted an "open letter" to President Jammeh on Facebook, which adopted a violent tone. Jagne reassured his sister that it was just rhetoric. The same month, Jagne discussed endowing a political fund to fuel opposition on an ongoing basis. To this end, his sister suggested getting in touch with Cherno Nije, who she had met at a conference. Cherno Njie had been funding a radio station in Senegal which broadcast anti-Jammeh propaganda into The Gambia, and had previously paid for Manneh's travel to lobby the United Nations in favour of sanctions against The Gambia.

In 2013, President Jammeh removed Lt Col. Lamin Sanneh from commander of his Presidential Guard. Sanneh then fled to Washington, D.C. There, he got in touch with his friend Banka Manneh, who put Sanneh in touch with Jagne. Jagne also recruited Papa Faal, Alhagie Barrow, other Gambians, and veterans of the United States Army, as well as several Gambians living in Europe.

Over time, the group got increasingly political. In March 2014, Manneh wrote "Is military action a viable option? Me thinks, what do you?:)." Jagne & Manneh convinced Niji to finance the plot, and the budget for the coup was set to $200,000. Banka Manneh, who claimed to have high level friends in the Gambian military, claimed he would be able to gather a force of 160 soldiers from inside The Gambia to assist in the coup. Barrow and Jagne began buying weapons. Manneh drafted a document titled "Transition Into the Third Republic," which placed Cherno Nije as interim president for 2 years.

The group planned to ambush Jammeh's motorcade, disable the lead vehicle, and persuade the bodyguards to disarm themselves. They also formed an alternative plan to attack the State House of the Gambia, the official presidential residence, again hoping to negotiate with the guards but preparing for forceful entry if needed. If they failed, they planned to blend in with civilian clothes. If they succeeded, they planned to recruit the military to secure critical infrastructure, shut down cell service, and have Manneh use state radio and television to announce their success.

They shipped their weapons and flew to Dakar, Senegal. The FBI attempted to contact numerous participants. Manneh did not attend, as he had discovered an alternate plot by Niji which did not include him. They decided to attack the State House and instead kidnap General Saul Badjie, because Jammeh was leaving.

== Events ==
On December 30, 2014, the gunmen recruited by the plotters attacked the State House. Local media quickly identified them as having entered the country from neighbouring Senegal under the command of Lt Col. Lamin Sanneh. The gunmen engaged in heavy fire with government forces. Soldiers blocked several points of entry to the city and a full blackout of the state radio and television was placed into effect.

The fighting diminished later during the day. Banks and other businesses remained closed while state radio played traditional music, mentioning nothing of the night's events. Four people, including Sanneh and Njaga Jagne, were killed, and several more were injured.

With the gunmen failing to consolidate control, the coup failed. Jammeh returned to Gambia the following day. Jammeh reshuffled his cabinet on January 10.

== Aftermath ==
After the coup failed, Papa Faal, one of the co-conspirators, entered the United States embassy in Dakar, Senegal seeking protection. However, he was instead interrogated. On January 1, 2015, the United States Federal Bureau of Investigation raided homes in Georgia, Kentucky, Minnesota, and Texas as part of an investigation into the coup. That same weekend, the FBI also raided the offices of a Texas development firm. The owner of the Texas firm, Cherno Nije, was arrested at Washington Dulles International Airport and charged with violating the successor statute to the Neutrality Act of 1794. During the raid on Nije's home in Texas, the FBI found a manifesto entitled "Gambia Reborn: A Charter for Transition from Dictatorship to Democracy and Development," as well as a spreadsheet detailing the coup attempt's $221,000 budget funded by Nije, who was a millionaire. Faal was also charged and later pleaded guilty. Two others, Alagie Barrow of Tennessee and Banka Manneh of Georgia, were also charged. Both later pleaded guilty as well.

Nije was sentenced to one year and one day in prison, Barrow and Manneh each received six-month sentences, while Faal was sentenced to time served.

The Washington Post later revealed that the FBI had interviewed Sanneh at his home in Maryland and thereafter tipped off Senegalese officials about the plot through the State Department.

It was reported on 2 April 2017 that the corpses of three alleged conspirators, Lamin Sanneh, Alagie Nyass and Njaga Jagne were discovered by Gambian police after the fall of the Jammeh regime.

== See also ==
- 1994 Gambian coup d'état
- Dawda Jawara
- History of the Gambia
- LGBT rights in the Gambia
