= Yellow Ribbon Reintegration Program =

Yellow Ribbon Reintegration Program (YRRP)
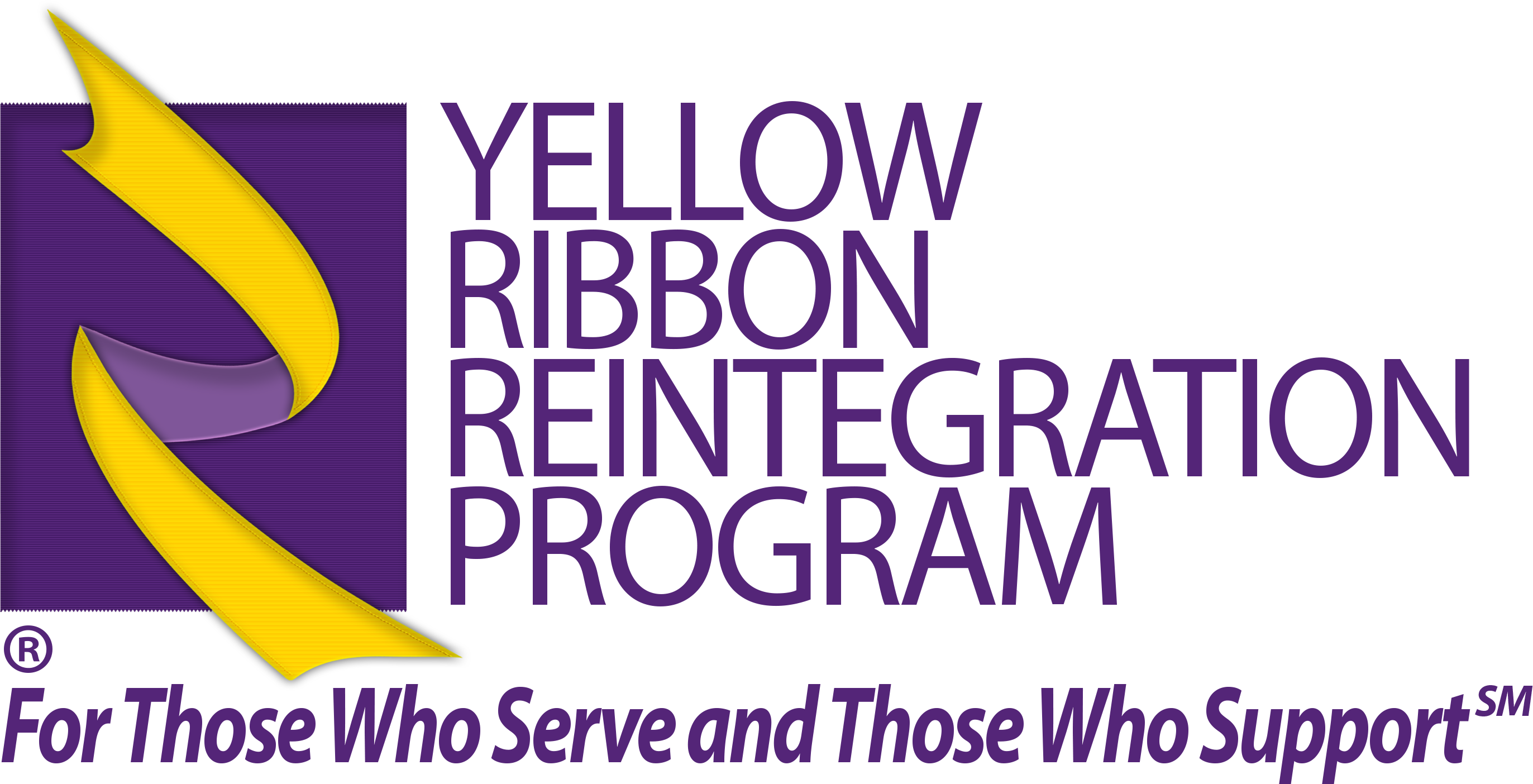

Agency overview
- Formed: 2008
- Jurisdiction: Federal government of the United States
- Headquarters: Washington, D.C.
- Website: YRRP Web site

The Yellow Ribbon Reintegration Program (YRRP) is a United States Department of Defense (DoD) effort to promote the well-being of National Guard and Reserve members, their families and communities, by connecting them with resources throughout the deployment cycle. Congress directed the Secretary of Defense to establish the YRRP in 2008 in Section 582 as part of Public Law (PL) 110-181 in direct response to the Nation's recognition of the challenges facing the Reserve Component community. Since 2008, YRRP has served more than 1.4 million Service members and their families. The Yellow Ribbon Reintegration Program is aligned under the Family and Employer Programs and Policy Office within the Office of the Assistant Secretary of Defense for Manpower and Reserve Affairs.

Each Reserve Component implements the Yellow Ribbon Reintegration Program to meet the unique needs of their Service culture and in accordance with the Department of Defense Instruction 1342.28.

== Mission ==
The mission of the Yellow Ribbon Reintegration Program is to promote the well-being of National Guard and Reserve members, their families and communities, by connecting them with resources throughout the deployment cycle. YRRP connects Guard and Reserve service members, their families and loved ones with local resources before, during, and after deployments, especially during the reintegration phase that occurs months after service members return home.

Commanders and leaders play a critical role in assuring that Guard and Reserve service members and their families attend Yellow Ribbon Events where they can access information on health care, education/training opportunities, financial, and legal benefits. To contact Service Yellow Ribbon representatives click here.

YRRP is a congressionally mandated program that was established in 2008 under the National Defense Authorization Act (Section 582 of Public Law 110) which called for information events and activities for National Guard and Reserve service members and their families, to facilitate access to services supporting their health and well-being throughout the deployment cycle.

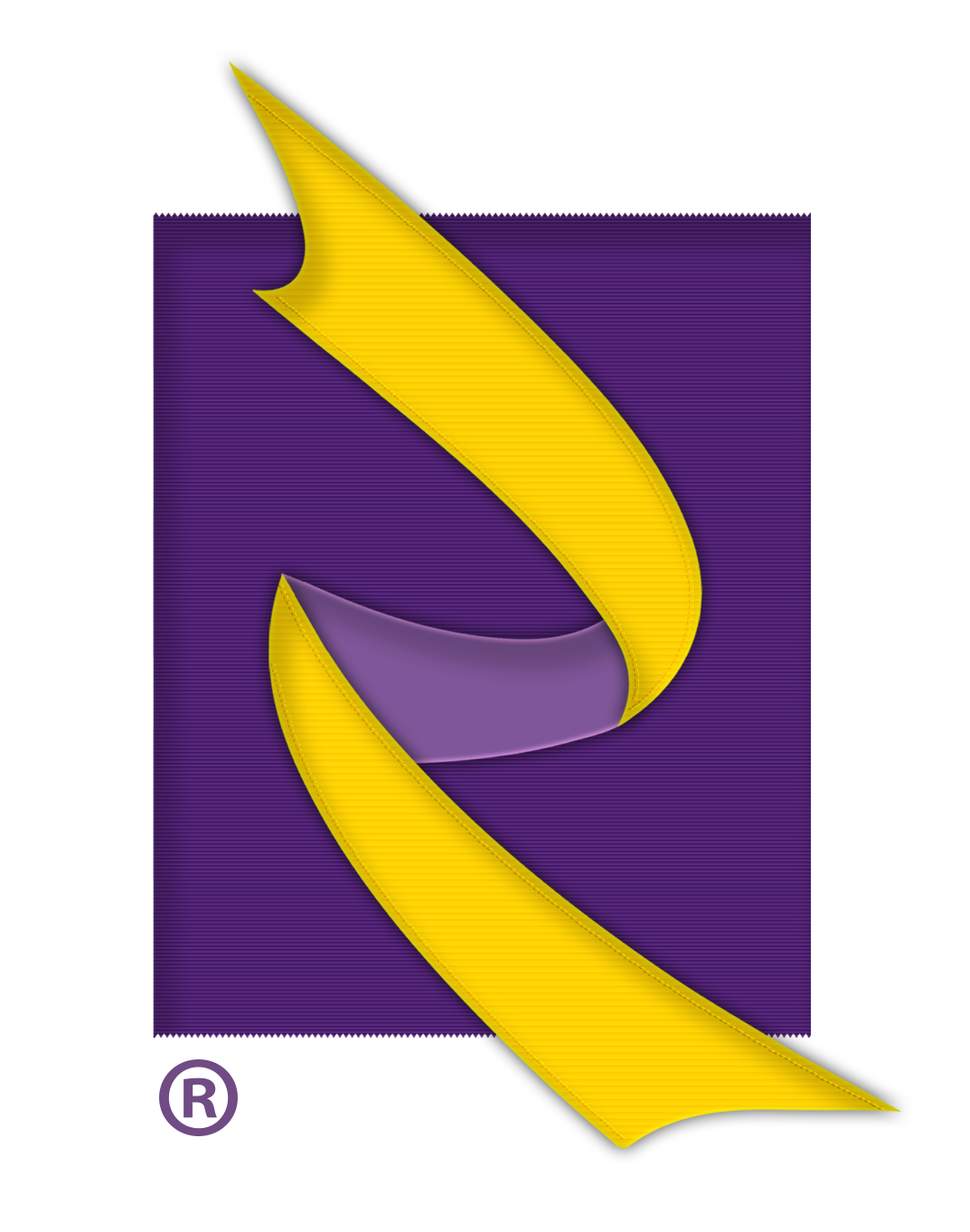
Yellow Ribbon Reintegration Program Logo No Tagline

== History ==
The National Defense Authorization Act of 2008 established the Yellow Ribbon Reintegration Program (YRRP) to assist National Guard and Reserve members as they transition between their military and civilian roles.

2008

On January 28, 2008, YRRP was established by the 2008 National Defense Authorization Act (NDAA) and becomes Public Law 110-181.

On March 17, the DoD YRRP Office opens and moves permanently to the Pentagon in January 2009.

The first of seven Substance Abuse and Mental Health Services Administration (SAMHSA) Policy Academies is conducted to help States develop strategic action plans to reintegrate veterans and their families.

2009

On October 28, the 2010 NDAA is signed by the President assigning YRRP responsibility for RC Suicide Prevention.

Each Guard and Reserve Component (RC), as well as the Department of Veterans Affairs, assigns a Liaison Officer to the DoD YRRP Office.

The Program Specialist initiative begins as a pilot with 10 Program Specialists and expands to 27 full-time Specialists nationwide within two years.

2010

The Cadre of Speakers initiative is introduced offering a pool of 40 dynamic speakers and facilitators for YRRP events.

The first YRRP Advisory Board meeting is held at the Pentagon.

YRRP publishes the inaugural edition of its program newsletter, The Ribbon.

YRRP conducts the multi-Service “Good to GREAT” training seminar for Event Planners and other professionals.

2011

On January 7, the 2011 NDAA expands authority of the Joint Travel Regulations to provide travel and transportation allowances to Service members and their designated representatives at YRRP events.

The RC Suicide Prevention Stakeholder Group is formed to expand suicide prevention resources and community healing opportunities.

On March 30, the Department of Defense Instruction 1342.28 for YRRP is signed.

YRRP's Employment Initiative Program introduces Hero2Hired (H2H) to connect job-seeking RC Service members and veterans with employers.

The YRRP Fiscal Year 2012-2015 Strategic Plan is published.

2012

H2H teams with the Chamber of Commerce's Hiring Our Heroes program to sponsor 40 job fairs nationwide. Additionally, the H2H Mobile Job Store visits 64 sites enabling the H2H.jobs website to register over 45,000 job seekers.

The RC Suicide Prevention Stakeholder Group publishes the Suicide Prevention and Resilience Resource Inventory and RC Suicide Postvention Plan: A Toolkit for Commanders.

YRRP launches its new Event Planning Tool: EventPLUS.

YRRP marks 1 million Service members and family members supported since inception.

DoD YRRP obtains exemption for core program events from the formal DoD conference approval process.

2013

On January 28, YRRP celebrates five years of dedicated support to Service members and their families.

YRRP documents its highest level of satisfaction with YRRP events (80% overall satisfaction).

2014

YRRP embraces a “flexible program delivery” approach, offering multiple access points for a transitional environment. Service members and their families can easily obtain relevant information and resources through growing technology. The flexibility of having in-person events combined with distance learning gives Commanders the tools to tailor events to their units’ specific needs.

2015

YRRP surpassed 1.5 million Service members and families supported since the program's inception, and the RCs conducted more than 1,000 YRRP events, directly affecting nearly 100,000 Service members and their families.

YRRP event satisfaction reached 87 percent in FY 2015, the highest event satisfaction achieved to date.

Congress approved YRRP's proposed amendments to the YRRP legislation for inclusion in the 2016 NDAA. ORP pursued these changes in collaboration with the seven RCs to improve YRRP effectiveness, including giving Services and commanders greater flexibility in conducting YRRP events based on the needs of their units and extending event eligibility to Service members and families, regardless of the type of mobilization or deployment.
