= Truth, Reconciliation and Reparations Commission =

Official body in The Gambia, 2017–2018

Commission overview
- Formed: 15 October 2018; 8 years ago
- Jurisdiction: The Republic of The Gambia
- Headquarters: Dunes Resort Hotel, Kotu Beach, Kololi, The Gambia
- Minister responsible: Ba Tambadou, Minister of Justice
- Commission executives: Baba Galleh Jallow, Executive Secretary; Lamin J. Sise, Chairperson; Essa M. Faal, Lead Counsel

The Truth, Reconciliation and Reparations Commission (TRRC) is a truth commission in The Gambia to "investigate and establish an impartial histoeical record of the human rights violations committed from July 1994 to January 2017", during rule of former President Yahya Jammeh, and consider reparations for the victims of those violations. The Commission was established on 13 January 2018 by Gambian National Assembly, through the Truth, Reconciliation and Reparations Act of 13 December 2017. Its final report was submitted to the President on 25 November 2021 and made public on 24 December 2021. As per its final report, "during its operations, the TRRC recorded two thousand six hundred statements. From January 2019 to May 2021, a total of three hundred and ninety-two (392) witnesses testified before the Commission over eight hundred and seventy-one (871) days. Although most witnesses who testified were victims, there were also adversely mentioned persons and confessed perpetrators". Its executive secretary was Baba Galleh Jallow, its lead counsel is Essa M. Faal, and the chairperson of the 11-strong commission is Lamin J. Sise.

== History ==
=== Establishment ===
The process for founding the TRRC was led by the Attorney General, Ba Tambadou. At a press conference on 20 July 2017, Tambadou announced that a draft bill for the establishment of the TRRC had been shared with international experts for review. He also announced that a team, led by himself, would begin a public engagement tour on the bill in August, which lasted from 14 to 24 August. Tambadou then proceeded to table the bill before the National Assembly. On 13 December 2017, the Truth, Reconciliation and Reparations Commission (TRC) Act was passed, and it received presidential assent on 13 January 2018.

Barrow appointed academic Baba Galleh Jallow as Executive Secretary of the TRRC with effect from 1 February 2018. Also in February, a call was made for nominations to the TRRC. The job description specified that individuals should be of "high moral character and integrity," "no criminal record or involvement in past human rights violations," no political party activity, and residency in either the Greater Banjul Area or in the diaspora. In August 2018, Jallow appointed Alagie Barrow as the director of research and investigation for the commission. It was announced that the commission would begin proceedings on 15 October 2018. On 5 October, Abdoulie Janneh, who had previously been announced as the chairperson of the commissioners, stepped down from the role due to scheduling conflicts. Lamin J. Sise, a close confidante of the late UN Secretary-General Kofi Annan, was announced to replace him.

=== Launch ===
The commission was launched at Dunes Resort Hotel, Kotu Beach, Kololi, on 15 October. It was launched by President Adama Barrow and attended by senior figures including Mariam Jack-Denton, the Speaker of the National Assembly, Hassan Bubacar Jallow, the Chief Justice, and members of the diplomatic corps, the National Assembly, civil society, and international organisations. Barrow noted that the TRRC would be independent, and was the sixth truth commission launched in Africa in its history. Other speakers included Ba Tambadou, the Attorney General, Sherif Kijera of The Gambia Centre for Victims of Human Rights Violations, Fatou Bensouda, the former chief prosecutor of the International Criminal Court (June 2012 - June 2021), Mohamed Ibn Chambas, the UN Secretary-General's special representative for West Africa, and Miguel de Serpa Soares, the UN Under-Secretary-General for Legal Affairs. Baba Galleh Jallow delivered the vote of thanks.

== Staff and commissioners ==
=== Staff ===
A number of job posting were advertised, starting in June 2018, at the commission. Five research assistants, nine investigators, and 20 statement takers were advertised for. A number of coordinator roles were also advertised for, including in victim support, community outreach, youth and children, and women's affairs.

Job Title	Name	Background
Executive Secretary	Baba Galleh Jallow	Assistant professor of history, La Salle University; Former editor, The Daily Observer
Deputy Executive Secretary	Musu Bakoto Sawo	Lecturer in law, University of The Gambia; Gambia programme officer, The Girl Generation
Lead Counsel	Essa M. Faal	Defence counsel, International Criminal Court; Senior partner, Faal and Co
Director of Research and Investigations	Alagie Barrow	Former officer, Tennessee Army National Guard
Deputy Director of Research and Investigations	Mansour Jobe	State counsel, Attorney General's Chambers; Former lecturer in law, Gambia Technical Training Institute
Director of Communications, Outreach and Media	Rohey Samba	Secretary general, Writers' Association of The Gambia; Secretary to the board, Collecting Society of The Gambia
Chief Financial Officer	Alieu Awe	
Director of Human Resources	Mam Ndery Touray	
Victim Support Coordinator	Ebou Faye Njie	
Reconciliation Officer	Tabu Sarr	
Community Outreach Coordinator	Vacant	
Youth and Children's Network Coordinator	Babucarr Sambou	
Women's Affairs Coordinator	Yadicon Njie Eribo	

=== Commissioners ===
This is the list of designated commissioners released to the media in August 2018, they are not yet confirmed.

Name	Special Role	Background
Lamin J. Sise	Chairperson	Special advisor and chief of staff to Kofi Annan; Director for Legal Affairs, Human Rights and Special Assignments in the Executive Office of the UN Secretary-General
Adelaide Sosseh Gaye	Vice-Chairperson	Director, Gambia Africa Institute for Leadership (GAIL); Former principal, St. Joseph's High School, Banjul
Anna N'gulu Jones		Gambia national coordinator, West Africa Network for Peacebuilding (WANEP)
Mustapha Kah		Founder, Banjul Open Debate; Independent candidate for Jeshwang, 2017 parliamentary election, Member, National Youth Council
Abdourahman Sey	Central River Region	Imam
Ma Nyima Bojang	West Coast Region	Teacher; Former magistrate, Banjul Magistrates' Court
Amie Samba	Lower River Region	Retired civil servant
Lang Kinteh	North Bank Region	Retired civil servant
Jammeh Ceesay	Upper River Region	Farmer
James Yaw Allen Odico		Bishop of Gambia
Ousainou Jallow		Imam, Pipeline Mosque
