= Gambia Workers' Union =

GWU
- Gambia Workers' Union
- Founded: 1956
- Dissolved: 1977 (deregistered)
- Headquarters: Banjul, the Gambia
- Location: The Gambia

The Gambia Workers' Union (GWU) was a general trade union in Gambia.

== History ==
The GWU was founded in 1956 by M. E. Jallow, the organisation's first Secretary General, and officially registered in July 1958. Initially organising workers in the construction sector, the union grew in the late 1950s following successful actions with dock workers who won improved wages and bonuses. In 1959, the union merged with the Gambia Labour Union (GLU), although this merger was annulled shortly afterwards over differences towards independence and international trade union relations. In 1977, the government withdrew the union's certificate of registration following a failure to submit accounts.

The union was permitted to re-register around 1982, but was soon banned again. Jallow was then appointed as general secretary of the new Gambia Workers' Confederation.

== See also ==
- Alieu Ebrima Cham Joof
- Bathurst Trade Union
