= Bathurst Trade Union =

The Bathurst Trade Union (BTU) was the first trade union in The Gambia and the first legally registered trade union in the African continent. Founded by Edward Francis Small in 1929 in Bathurst (now Banjul), the organisation emerged from the Carpenters' and Shipwrights' Society.

In October the same year the BTU was joined by other craft associations. The BTU received support from the British Labour Research Department and the British section of the League against Imperialism. In the fall of 1929, BTU led a 3-week strike and membership grew rapidly that by April 1930 membership stood at around 1,000.

Later, the BTU was torn apart by internal divisions. In 1932 Small was challenged for the union's leadership by J. L. Njie. The conflict had both political and ethnic aspects (Njie was a Wolof). Njie had the support of the conservative elites of the city, who were uncomfortable with Small's activism. In March 1933, Njie registered the BTU with himself as its chairman. Small tried to regain power of the BTU for two years, but in May 1935 he broke away and formed the Gambia Labour Union instead.

In the 1961 groundnut trade season, Alieu Ebrima Cham Joof — a member of the Select Committee and an old protegế of Edward Francis Small together with his associates at the Gambia Workers' Union organised a national strikes against the British colonial authorities and the Chambers of Commerce. The purpose of that strike was to demand proper remuneration for the daily paid workers who were poorly paid. The strike went on for five days. In that strike, Joof jumped on the stage and proclaimed to his followers that he is going to set the country on fire if needs be but "nobody is going to work for them" [the British].

== See also ==
- Alieu Ebrima Cham Joof
- Gambia Workers Union
