= Essa M. Faal =

Gambian international lawyer

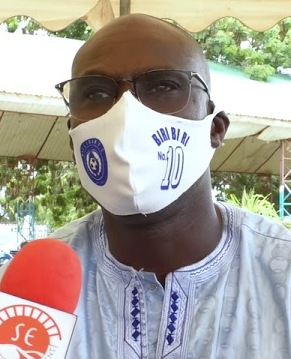
- Faal in 2020

Prosecutor of the Truth, Reconciliation and Reparations Commission
- Incumbent
- Assumed office 6 September 2018
- President: Adama Barrow
- Preceded by: Position established

Personal details
- Born: Essa Mbye Faal; 13 March 1966 (age 60) Bathurst (now Banjul, The Gambia (1965–1970)
- Citizenship: Gambian citizenship
- Education: Fourah Bay College; University of the West Indies

Essa Mbye Faal (born 13 March 1966) is a Gambian international lawyer who is a defence counsel at the International Criminal Court (ICC) and a senior partner at Faal and Co. Faal led the prosecution in the Darfur investigations and as a lead defence counsel for a number of other cases. In 2018, he was appointed as chief prosecutor at the Gambian Truth, Reconciliation and Reparations Commission (TRRC).

== Education ==
Faal was born on 13 March 1966 in Banjul (then named Bathurst). He holds an LLB from Fourah Bay College, University of Sierra Leone, and an LLM in legislative drafting and public law from the University of the West Indies.

== Legal career ==
Faal began his legal career as a state counsel at the Ministry of Justice in 1994. He served as counsel to the Commission of Inquiry into the Financial Activities of Public Corporations. At the end of 1997, Faal was appointed as first secretary and later counselor for legal affairs at The Gambia's Permanent Mission to the United Nations (UN), based in New York, United States. In 2000, Faal was appointed as a judicial affairs officer by the UN, who deployed him to the UN Transitional Administration in East Timor. In this capacity, he contributed to the re-establishment of the justice system in the country. In 2002, he was made Acting Deputy General Prosecutor for Serious Crimes, and later was promoted to Chief of Prosecutions.

In 2005, Faal joined the International Development Law Organisation (IDLO) in Rome, Italy. He was responsible for designing and directing the implementation of justice sector reform programmes in developing countries. 2006 saw him appointed by the International Criminal Court (ICC) to lead the investigations into the Darfur genocide, in which 300,000 had allegedly been killed. The investigation led to the indictment of several senior members of the Sudanese government for genocide and crimes against humanity. Faal was later appointed to the position of senior trial lawyer and lead prosecuting counsel for the Darfur cases.

Between 2011 and 2016, Faal served as co-lead defence counsel for a number of cases in the ICC, relating to Kenya, Liberia, Libya, and the Philippines. Individuals he has defended include Mohammed Hussein Ali, William Ruto, Uhuru Kenyatta, and Francis Muthaura. He has also served as counsel for Charles Taylor, who he has represented pro bono, and Saif al-Islam Gaddafi. In 2018, he was appointed as the prosecutor for the Gambian Truth, Reconciliation and Reparations Commission (TRRC).

In November 2021, Essa M. Faal's candidacy for the presidential election of 2021 as an independent was validated by the Independent Electoral Commission (IEC).
