= Gambia Workers' Confederation =

GWC
- Gambia Workers' Confederation
- Founded: 1985
- Headquarters: Banjul, the Gambia
- Location: The Gambia
- Key people: Pa Moudou K.B. Faal, secretary general
- Affiliations: ITUC

The Gambia Workers' Confederation is a trade union centre in The Gambia. It is affiliated with the International Trade Union Confederation.

== History ==
The Gambia Worker's Confederation was founded in 1985 with M. E. Jallow as its first secretary general, notably the secretary general of the banned, Gambia Workers' Union. The next secretary general was Pa Moudo Faal.

ICTUR reports that secretary general Pa Moudou K.B. Faal was arrested by the National Investigation Agency in both December 1996 and April 1997 when he planned to travel abroad.
