= Three Years Jotna =

Political advocacy group

Three Years Jotna was a political advocacy group in the Gambia between 2019 and 2021 that staged protests advocating for the resignation of President Adama Barrow.

== Background ==
Prior to 2016 Gambian presidential election, a group of opposition parties reluctantly came together with a common goal of ending the 22 year regime of Yahya Jammeh. After the formation of the coalition, a primary was conducted at the Kairaba Beach Hotel, and Adama Barrow, a Real-Estate Developer and a former executive member of the biggest opposition party United Democratic Party (U.D.P) won the inter-party primary and he became the coalition representative. However, one key clause in the coalition agreement penned by all the presidential aspirants is that whoever win the election will be president for only 3 years; during which he will lead the transitional government and ensure all the necessary reforms such as security reform, media, electoral, a new constitution etc. and including overseeing the elections in which he would not contest.

President Barrow, who had since reneged on the coalition agreement, towards the middle of his term that he was ultimately elected to, was criticised for increasingly aligning himself to the former regime of Yaya Jammeh that he unseated. For instance, six ministers also worked under Jammeh. Among them is Ousman Sowe, the current director of the infamous state's National Intelligence Agency (NIA), who had been accused of serious crimes. Finance Minister Mam Burr Njie was also implicated in controversies, specifically alleged involvement in the spending of millions of dollars of state money. Many political analysts argued that the misappropriations of states funds, Jammeh-like status quo and the of UDP leader Ousainou Darboe led to dissatisfaction among many Gambians.

3 Years Jotna became even stronger after the public statement by the U.D.P party secretary general in support of 3 year agenda. This was contrary to Darboe's previous position on the issue prior to his sacking, which was that President Barrow should serve the 5 year constitutional mandate. Darboe had even went as far as to saying that “(he) will take anyone to court who forcefully ask for president Barrow’s resignation”. Later Darboe changed his position and said that the “UDP (urges) all the parties to the 2016 Coalition agreement, particularly its principal beneficiary, President Adama Barrow to be faithful to the terms and conditions of the Gambian electorates that if elected he will serve for a term of three years only and step down to supervise free, fair and transparent presidential elections.” Many Gambians believed that the coalition failed the electorate.

The group's name drives from the Wolof word jotna, roughly translating to the English verb "to be elapsed", and thus a proper translation of the movement's name would be "Three Years Are Up". The group consists of eight local executive members and two outspoken members based in the diaspora. The movement has been demanding Barrow's resignation from power in accordance with his campaign promise during the 2016 Gambian presidential election to step down after three years in power. The group was headed by a Gambian-based American known as King Sport, who was regarded as the architect of the movement alongside Gambian-based Brit Sheriff Ceesay.

== Protests and counter-protests ==
Following media war and competition for crowd size, 3 Years Jotna conduct their first peaceful protest in December, 2019 at the outskirt of the capital, Banjul near Denton Bridge to handover their petition to the president. The police assigning of that region was regarded by many as a calculated move to dissuade supporters of the movement from attending the protest. However, it was claimed that over 30,000 Gambians attended the protest. A pro-Barrow group called 'Gambia for 5 years' did a counter protest to change the narrative.

3 Years Jotna sought a police permit to stage another protest, but their application was denied and alternate dates were proposed. Negotiations between the organisation and government were brokered through civic society organisations and religious leaders, which ultimately resulted to the police issuance of permit with a 3 hour time limit. On the day of the protest, a heavy militarised group was stationed at the site of the protest, which quickly turned violent. Police fired tear gas and stones were allegedly coming from both sides, resulting in many injuries. No fatalities were confirmed despite initial reports of 3 deaths.

== Government crackdown ==
Government spokesman Bai Sankareh released a statement banning the movement and shutting down two independent radio stations 'King FM' and 'Home Digital Radio' that covered the protest. Information minister and Barrow ally Ebrima Sillah said that he was not aware of the closure of the radio stations at the time. Subsequently, the leadership of the movement was arrested, including chairman Abdou Njie who was arrested while visiting victims at a local hospital in Kanifing. Other arrestees include lawyer Yankuba Darboe, prominent UK-based Gambian Lawyer Haji Sawaneh, in addition to Kitim Jarju, Sherrifo Sonko, Fanta Mballow, and Karim Touray. They were imprisoned at a prison in Banjul.

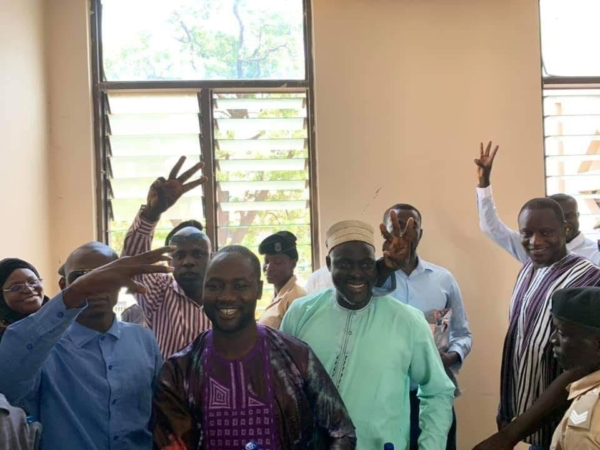
Granting of bail to movement leaders

== Release of leaders ==
The movements' executives were remanded for weeks without bail despite multiple attempts by their defense lawyers. However, they were eventually released after the government dropped much of the charges.
