= Edward Francis Small =

Gambian politician (1891–1958)

Member of the Legislative Council for Bathurst
- In office 31 December 1941 – 1958

Personal details
- Born: 29 January 1891 Bathurst, British Gambia
- Died: January 1958 (aged 66–67)
- Party: Rate Payers' Association

Edward Francis Small (29 January 1891 – January 1958) was a Gambian statesman who has been described as the "trailblazer of Gambian political consciousness." One of the few educated Africans in the Gambia Colony and Protectorate during the early 20th century, Small founded the country's first trade union (Bathurst Trade Union), the country's first political party (Rate Payers' Association), and was the first citizen elected to its legislature. He was also a delegate to and leader of the National Congress of British West Africa (NCBWA).

== Early life and education ==
Small was born in Bathurst in 1891, the son of John W. Small and Elizabeth Thomas. Thomas, a Sierra Leonean immigrant, was of the Aku people, as was John. At the time of Small's birth, Africa had already been partitioned by the 1884 Berlin Conference. Small was initially educated in The Gambia, but due to the lack of a high school, had to relocate to Freetown, Sierra Leone, for his secondary education. He attended Methodist Boys' High School in Freetown and in 1910 began teaching at a school there, moving back to Bathurst in 1915 to continue working as a teacher.

== Missionary work ==
Small joined the Wesleyan Methodist Mission in Bathurst. He earned the respect of the Mission people and was sent to open a mission in Balanghar, then a thriving trading town and holiday resort. He spent 18 months there, before being sent to Sukuta following a physical confrontation with a white trader over bell ringing. The Divisional Commissioner sided with the white trader in the dispute, resulting in Small's removal to Sukuta. The incident has since been described as an "imperialist maneuver [in] getting rid of an unwanted person".

== Nationalism and pan-Africanism ==
Small aimed to empower the ordinary people of Gambia, especially farmers and workers. As one of the few educated Africans in the territory, he aimed to empower them with knowledge and information. He organised evening classes for village people, and founded the first nationalist newspaper in the country. He used this to reach his followers even when in exile in Senegal. He founded the Gambia Native Defense Union (GNDU) alongside other Akus. He also founded The Gambia Farmer's Cooperative Association in 1917, and the Bathurst Trade Union in 1929. He attended a conference in Accra, the Gold Coast, in 1920, delivering a speech on the right of West Africans to self-rule. The result of the conference was the formation of the National Congress of British West Africa, and Small set up the Gambian branch on his return.

In 1922 Small founded a newspaper, the Gambia Outlook and Senegambian Reporter, which was published for the first time in Dakar (Senegal) in May of that year. It was one of the earlier newspapers with a Pan-African/Senegambian philosophy. In 1929, his trade union organised the country's first strike. His slogan for much of his campaigning was "no taxation without representation". In the 1930s Small founded in the Rate Payers' Association (RPA), which was effectively the country's first political party and dominated local politics in Bathurst. The RPA won all six seats on the municipal council open to African candidates in the 1936 elections.

Small also created a political network during his visit to the French West Africa (AOF). In June 1931, Small took his mission to Dakar accompanied by his secretary Boubakar Secka. Senegal at the time, had a growing interest in communism and pan-Africanism. On his visit, Small met several Senegalese activists with communist, anti-colonial and pan-African ideologies. The room he rented on Rue Félix Faure became a meeting place where Small would discuss his political ideologies. Some of Small's AOF acquaintances included Ernest Cherry, an individual involved in the League for the Defence of the Negro Race (LDNR), with ties to the French League against Colonial Oppression; Fofana Coulibaly, a former teacher from French Guinea with extremist ideology and anti-French sentiments; and Raphael Mensah, a man "on a list of individuals suspected of being sympathizers of the revolutionary movement." Small also had links with English-speaking blacks including William Winston, one of the people involved in the Garveyist incidents of 1922.

Small was appointed to the Legislative Council on 31 December 1941 representing Bathurst Municipal Council. In 1947 the first direct elections were held for a seat on the Legislative Council. Backed by his trade union, Small was victorious, defeating I. M. Garba Jahumpa and Sheikh Omar Faye. He was subsequently appointed to the Executive Council on 11 December 1947, and was later reappointed to the council on 18 January and 12 June 1951. He continued to be involved in Gambian politics until his death in January 1958.

Alongside Ibrahim Muhammadu Garba-Jahumpa, Small attended the 1945 World Trade Union Conference in London, England.

== Legacy ==
Small's trade unionism inspired Alieu Ebrima Cham Joof, who went on to organise and lead the Bread and Butter Demonstration of 1959 that paved the way for Gambian independence.
