= Gambia Democratic Congress =

Political party in the Gambia

- Leader: Mama Kandeh
- Founded: 2016
- Split from: Alliance for Patriotic Reorientation and Construction
- Ideology: Social democracy Third Way
- Political position: Centre to centre-left
- National Assembly: 0 / 58

Website
- www.gdc.gm

Gambia Democratic Congress is a political party in the Gambia led by Mama Kandeh, a former APRC National Assembly member. It was established in 2016.

The initial deputy leader, Facuru Sillah, later left the party after a dispute with Kandeh. Kandeh ended up as the third most voted candidate with 12.32% of the vote in the 2021 election, which was won by incumbent president Adama Barrow.

== Electoral history ==
=== Presidential elections ===
| Election | Candidate | Votes | % | Result |
|---|---|---|---|---|
| 2016 | Mama Kandeh | 89,768 | 17.07% | Lost ✗ |
| 2021 | Mama Kandeh | 105,902 | 12.32% | Lost ✗ |

=== National Assembly elections ===
| Election | Leader | Votes | % | Seats | +/– | Position | Government |
|---|---|---|---|---|---|---|---|
| 2017 | Mama Kandeh | 65,938 | 17.38% | 5 / 58 | New | ▲2nd | Opposition |
| 2022 | Mama Kandeh | 33,882 | 6.88% | 0 / 58 | ▼5 | ▼3rd | Extra-parliamentary |
