= Muslim Congress Party =

Islamic political party in Gambia

The Muslim Congress Party was a political party in the Gambia. The party was founded during the pre-independence period to represent the Muslim population in the colony of Bathurst (now Banjul). The party was led by I.M. Garba-Jahumpa. The party emerged from the Bathurst Young Muslim Society.

Garba-Jahumpa won one of the three directly elected seats in the Legislative Council in 1951 and 1954, as the MCP candidate. It contested the 1960 election in alliance with the People's Progressive Party (which was based in the rural areas).

Ahead of the 1962 election, the MCP merged with the Democratic Party to form the Democratic Congress Alliance.
