= Legislative Council of the Gambia =

Type
- Type: Unicameral of Gambia Colony and Protectorate

History
- Founded: 1843, 1888
- Disbanded: 1866, 1960
- Succeeded by: House of Representatives of the Gambia

The Legislative Council of the Gambia was the legislature of the Gambia Colony and Protectorate from 1843 to 1866, and from 1888 to 1960.

== History ==
The Gambia had formed part of the British crown colony known as the Province of Senegambia, however this was revoked in 1821 and for legislative affairs The Gambia had to turn to Sierra Leone. In 1843, a Legislative Council in The Gambia consisting of the Governor and no less than two other public officials was created. In 1866, opinion back in Britain was in favour of withdrawing from Africa, and all British West African colonies were placed under the control of Sierra Leone again, per Colonel Harry Ord's suggestion. The Legislative Council established in 1843 was abolished, and a small council, consisting of the Administrator, the Collector of Customs, and the Chief Magistrate was created in its place. It was merely advisory and important legislative decisions were made in Sierra Leone. Nevertheless, over its lifetime it was gradually expanded, and by its supersedence by the Legislative Council again, it consisted of five officials and four unofficial members, of whom two were Africans.

The Gambia was detached from Sierra Leone in 1888, and the Legislative Council was re-established. It consisted of the Governor, the Treasurer, the Chief Magistrate, the Collector of Customs, and other people who held office in the colony as ex-officio members. Provision also existed for the appointment of unofficial members, who could hold office for five years and be re-appointed.

The Legislative Council was established along with the Executive Council in 1901 as part of a progression towards self-government. By the 1940s, the Legislative Council had three or four unofficial members who were natives of the Gambia nominated by the Governor to serve on the council, but could not vote. In 1944, it was announced that proposals allowing for the direct election of one member had been put forward and were being implemented.

== Structure ==
The Governor of the Gambia acted as the president of the Legislative Council, as well as of the Executive Council. They had the power to make law by proclamation, as well as to veto any law passed by the Legislative Council. The unelected members of the Legislative Council were the Colonial Secretary, the Financial Secretary, the Attorney General, the Senior Commissioner, the Director of Medical Services and two members appointed by the Governor from a list of nine names submitted by Bathurst Town Council and the Kombo Rural Authority.

== Members ==
- Gustav Helm, 5 November 1874
- James Topp, 28 April 1876
- William Richard Townsend, Attorney General, 26 September 1902
- Thomas Estwick Peirce, Collector of Customs, 26 September 1902
- Samuel John Forster, unofficial member, re-appointed on 26 September 1902
- Henry Charles Goddard, unofficial member, re-appointed on 26 September 1902
- Edward St. John Jackson, Legal Adviser, 27 January 1913
- Herbert Densham Smith, Receiver General, 4 June 1925
- Major John Richard Gwyther MC, Director of Public Works, 17 August 1934
- John Reid Forde, Senior Medical Officer, 27 August 1934

== Elections ==
The first direct election for a seat on the Legislative Council took place in 1947, where Edward Francis Small was elected. Three seats were up for election in 1951. John Colley Faye (Democratic Party) and I.M. Garba-Jahumpa (Muslim Congress Party) were elected in Bathurst, while Henry Madi (Independent) was elected in Kombo St Mary.
