= Mama Kandeh =

Gambian politician (born 1965)

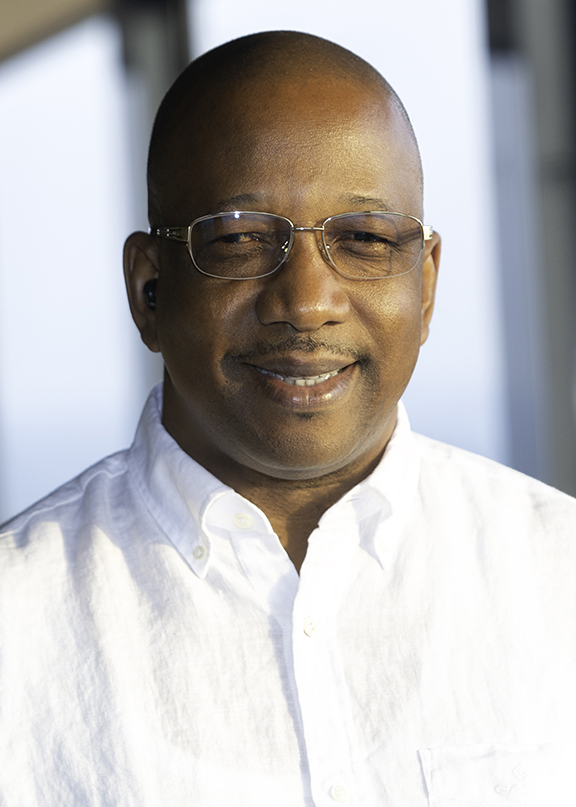

Personal details
- Born: 12 July 1965 (age 61)
- Party: Gambia Democratic Congress (2016–present); Alliance for Patriotic Reorientation and Construction (until 2016)

Mama Kandeh (born 12 July 1965) is a Gambian politician and leader of the Gambia Democratic Congress (GDC). Kandeh served as member of parliament of Jimana constituency from 2007 to 2012 and as member of the Pan-African Parliament from the Gambia. He was expelled from the APRC in 2013 and founded the Gambia Democratic Congress (GDC) political party in 2016. Since then he has contested the 2016 and 2021 Gambian presidential elections.

== Early life and education ==
Mama Kandeh was born on 12 July 1965 in Sare Birom village Jimara district. He attended Crab Island School in Banjul for his early education before enrolling at the Gambia Technical Training Institute (GTTI).

== Political career ==
Kandeh entered national politics as a member of the APRC. Kandeh entered national politics as a member of the APRC. Kandeh was elected to the National Assembly in the 2007 Gambian parliamentary election. He defeated Adama Barrow the United Democratic Party (UDP) candidate and current president of the Gambia. Kandeh was expelled from the APRC in April 2013 by the then President and APRC party leader Yahya Jammeh.

== Gambia Democratic Congress (GDC) ==
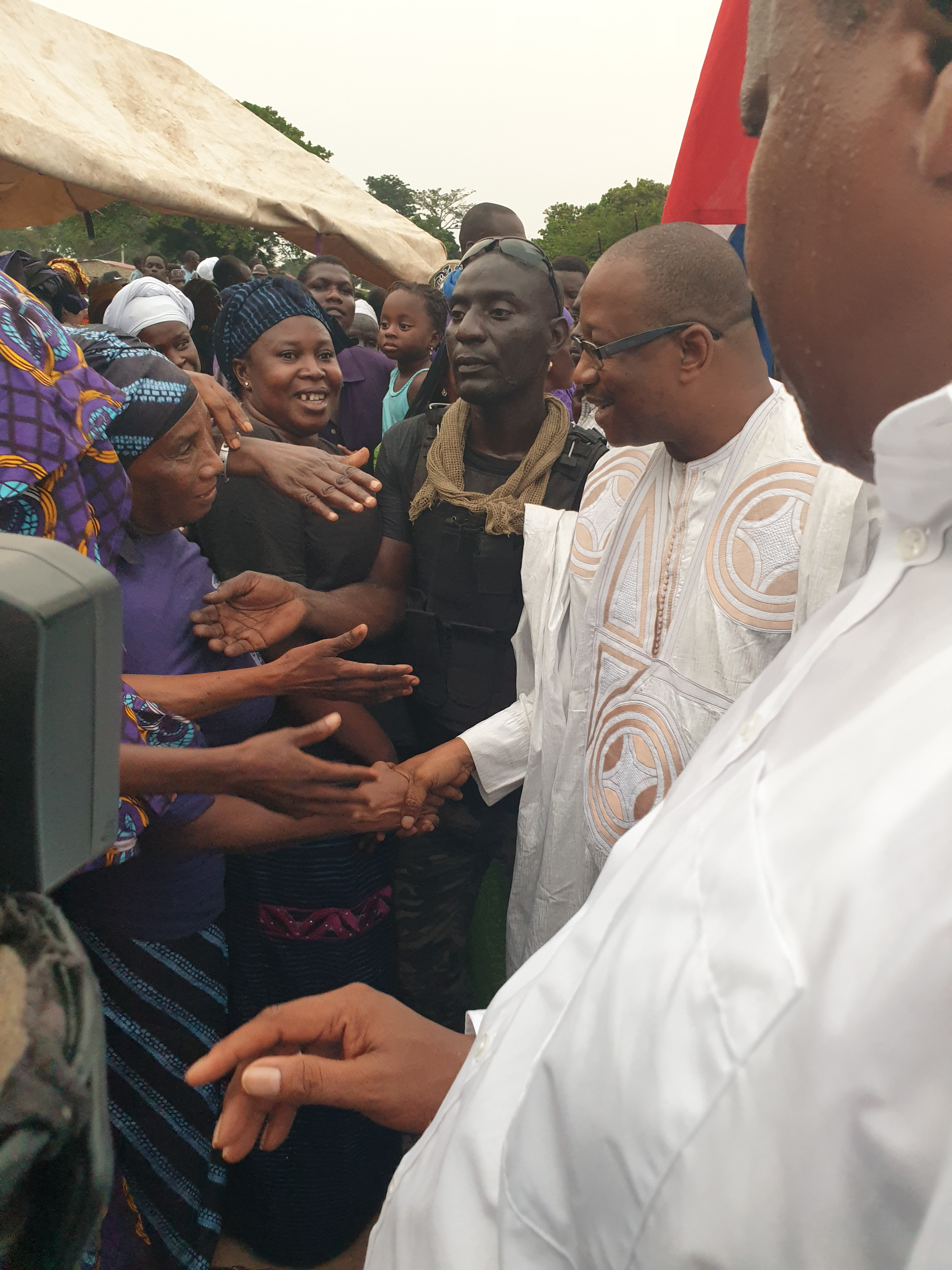
Mama Kandeh GDC leader greeting supporters

Following his expulsion from the Alliance for Patriotic Reorientation and Construction (APRC) in April 2013. Kandeh founded the Gambia Democratic Congress (GDC) in May 2016. At the party's first press conference after its registration, Kandeh described the GDC as a party committed to democracy, equality, social justice, respect for human rights, and inclusive national development.

== 2016 Gambia Presidential election ==
Mama Kandeh contested the 2016 Gambian presidential election as the candidate of the Gambia Democratic Congress (GDC). A political party he founded earlier that year after leaving the ruling APRC. His candidacy made the election a three-way contest between incumbent President Yahya Jammeh, Coalition 2016 candidate Adama Barrow, and Kandeh. He was nominated as the GDC's presidential candidate for the 2016 Gambian presidential election on 7 November. Although all opposition parties united behind Adama Barrow as a coalition candidate. Kandeh declined to join the coalition and contested the election under the GDC banner. He finished third in the election behind Barrow and incumbent President Yahya Jammeh. He received 89,768 votes (17.8%) of the votes.

== 2021 Presidential election ==
Mama Kandeh was again the presidential candidate of the Gambia Democratic Congress (GDC) in the 2021 Gambian presidential election. That marked his second consecutive bid for the presidency after contesting in 2016. His campaign was backed by the GDC and supported by a faction of the former ruling APRC .He was endorsed by ex-President and former rival Yahya Jammeh. Kandeh's candidacy for the presidential election of 2021 was validated by the Independent Electoral Commission (ICE) in November 2021. The election was held on 4 December 2021. According to the official results announced by the Independent Electoral Commission (IEC). Kandeh received 105,902 votes (12.32%). He finished third again behind incumbent Adama Barrow and Ousainou Darboe. Although his vote share declined from 17.07% in 2016 to 12.32% in 2021. He increased his total number of votes from 89,768 to 105,902.

Following the announcement of the election results. Mama Kandeh joined opposition candidates Ousainou Darboe and Essa Mbye Faal in rejecting the preliminary results announced by the IEC. The three candidates cited concerns over delays in the announcement of results. And they that alleged their party agents reported irregularities.

== 2026 Presidential election ==
Kandeh announced that the Gambia Democratic Congress had entered into a political alliance with President Adama Barrow's National People's Party ahead of the 2026 Gambian presidential election in late July 2026.
