= National People's Party (The Gambia) =

Political party in the Gambia

- Abbreviation: NPP
- President: Adama Barrow
- Chairman: Dembo Bojang
- Founder: Adama Barrow
- Founded: 31 December 2019
- Split from: United Democratic Party
- Ideology: Social conservatism
- Political position: Centre-right
- Colours: Grey
- National Assembly: 22 / 58

Website
- www.npp.gm

The National People's Party is a centre-right and social conservative Gambian political party centred around the leadership of the incumbent President of the Gambia, Adama Barrow.

== History ==
The NPP was founded on 31 December 2019 by Adama Barrow amidst internal turmoil within Coalition 2016. Relations had deteriorated between Barrow and his former party, the United Democratic Party (UDP). In 2019, Barrow dismissed UDP party leader Ousainou Darboe as his Vice President following disagreements. Darboe refused to support Barrow's re-election campaign for the 2021 election, instead launching his own.

Dou Sano, a presidential adviser, told the press that the "National People’s Party is here for all Gambians, it is here to wipe the tears of Gambians by solving the problems of Gambians." Reaction to the creation of the party was varied. Many supporters of Barrow have commented that Barrow legally had every right to found a party and run for-election, whilst others have argued that doing so was a betrayal of the Coalition 2016 agenda. Proponents of the latter view have protested, noting in particular that Barrow pledged to serve no longer than three years.

Barrow ultimately won re-election in 2021. In the 2022 parliamentary elections, the NPP won most seats. It then formed a coalition with the National Reconciliation Party and, controversially, the Alliance for Patriotic Reorientation and Construction.

== Governance ==
The NPP was registered with the Independent Electoral Commission on 31 December 2019. Barrow is both the party leader and Secretary General.

== Electoral history ==
=== Presidential elections ===
Election	Candidate	Votes	%	Result
2021	Adama Barrow	457,519	53.23%	Elected ✓

=== National Assembly elections ===
Election	Leader	Votes	%	Seats	+/–	Position	Government
2022	Adama Barrow	143,826	29.19%	18 / 53	▲18	▲1st	Coalition (NPP-NRP-APRC)
