= Democratic Party (Gambia) =

Political party in the Gambia

- Leader: Yusupha Dumbuya
- Founded: c. 1965

The Democratic Party (DP) is a political party in the Gambia. The party was founded during the pre-independence period in the colony of Bathurst, currently the national capital Banjul. Ahead of the 1962 general elections, the DP merged with the Muslim Congress Party to form the Democratic Congress Alliance. In 1960, founding member Alieu Ebrima Cham Joof was elected at its social secretary. Currently, the party is led by Yusupha Dumbuya.
