= Fogny =

Region in the Casamance

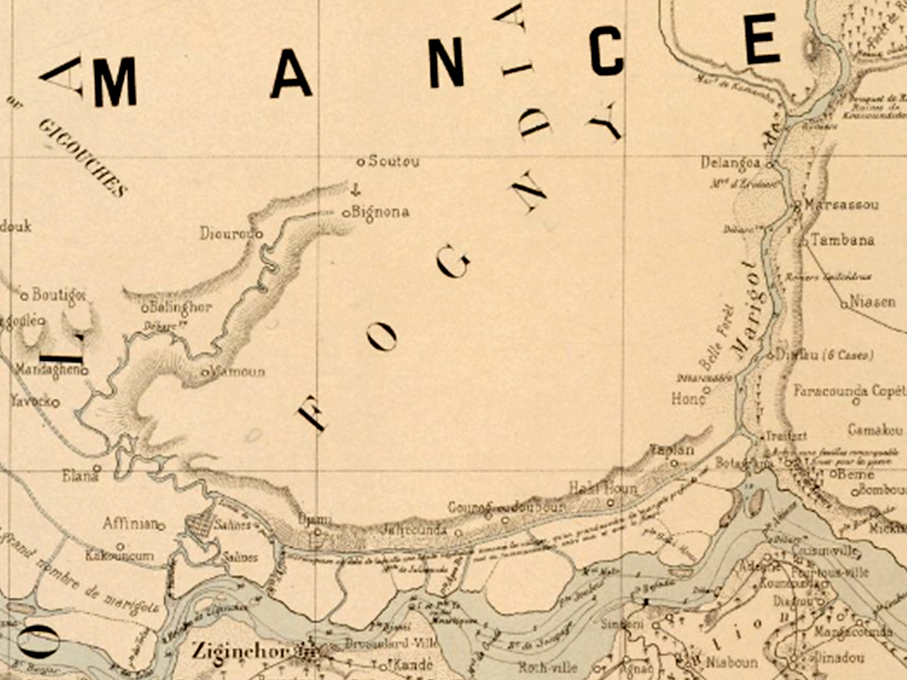
Map of Fogny

Fogny or Foni is a region in the Casamance shared between Senegal and The Gambia. On the Gambian side, four districts take the name: Foni Bintang-Karenai, Foni Bondali, Foni Brefet, and Foni Jarrol.

== Notable people ==
- Assane Seck (born 1919), politician
- Yahya Jammeh

== Bibliography ==
- Christian Roche, Histoire de la Casamance : Conquête et résistance 1850-1920, Karthala, 2000, 408 p. (Thèse Université de Paris I, remaniée)
- Famara Sané, Le commandement indigène dans l’administration coloniale du Fooñi, 1895-1960, Université de Dakar, 1996, 87 p. (Mémoire de Maîtrise)
- Sambou Simon, Le Fogny et les Français, 1894-1920, Université de Dakar, 1995, 129 p. (Mémoire de maîtrise)
