= Soma Solar Power Station =

Solar power station in Gambia

- Country: Gambia
- Location: Soma, Jarra West, Lower River Division
- Coordinates: 13°26′13″N 15°31′05″W
- Status: Proposed
- Construction began: 2023 (expected)
- Construction cost: US$130+ million
- Owner: Soma Solar Consortium

Solar farm
- Type: Flat-panel PV

Power generation
- Nameplate capacity: 150 MW

The Soma Solar Power Station is a planned 150 megawatts solar power plant in Gambia. The two lead developers of this renewable energy infrastructure are the Government of Gambia and the Economic Community of West African States (ECOWAS). The World Bank and the European Investment Bank, have jointly committed US$164 million in loans towards this development.

== Location ==
The power station is planned to sit on 225 hectares (556 acres) of land in the town of Soma, in Jarra West District, in the Lower River Division of Gambia. Soma, Gambia is located south of the River Gambia, approximately 182 kilometres (113 mi), east of the capital city of Banjul. By design, this solar farm is within the vicinity of the 225kV/30kV substation, under construction in Soma, by the Organisation pour la mise en valeur du fleuve Gambie (OMVG) (English: Gambia River Development Organization), whose membership comprises Gambia, Guinea, Guinea Bissau and (Senegal.

== Overview ==
As of January 2019, Gambia had total installed generating capacity of approximately 139 megawatts. Of this, the Gambia National Water and Electricity Company (NAWEC), generated 102 megawatts and an independent power producer generated approximately 26 megawatts, at Brikama, an urban centre, south of Banjul. All these installations use "expensive fossil-fuels" (either natural gas or heavy fuel oil). In addition, as of November 2021, there was a deficit of 11 megawatts in the Gambian grid during peak hours.

To mitigate these challenges, the concerned parties designed two inter-related strategies:

=== Strategy 1 ===
OMVG to build a 225kV transmission line to evacuate power from the 450 MW Sambangalou Hydroelectric Power Station, the 240 MW Kaleta Hydroelectric Power Station and the 530 MW Souapiti Hydroelectric Power Station and transmit this power to the major urban centres in the four countries where it is needed most.

A total of 15 substations will be built in the region, stepping down power from 225kV to 30kV for eventual distribution to homes, businesses and industry. One of those substations is under development in the town of Soma, Gambia.

=== Strategy 2 ===
The Gambia will build a 150 MW solar farm near the planned 250kV/30kV substation in Soma, to either upload power to stabilize the Gambian grid or for injection into the West African Power Pool or both, depending on conditions. The phased development of the solar farm will see the first 80 megawatts developed first, followed by the second phase of 70 megawatts developed about four years later. The design incorporates a battery energy storage system (BESS), in the 100MWh to 150MWh range.

== Developments ==
The tender for a consultant or consortium of consultants went out in August 2021. The consultant(s) will carry out a feasibility study. The study will guide as to the selection of an independent power producer (IPP), who will sign power purchase agreements (PPAs) with NAWEC and WAPP. It is anticipated that once an IPP is selected and the PPAs are signed, construction will take no more than two years.

In October 2022, a meeting was convened in Banjul, Gambia's capital city, in which representatives of the member countries of ECOWAS validated the feasibility study for the construction of the 150 MW Soma Solar Power Station, in Soma, Gambia. The meeting was also attended by the officials from the national electricity companies of the member countries of the Gambia River Development Organization (OMVG), the ECOWAS Regional Electricity Regulatory Authority (ERERA) and the World Bank.

== See also ==
- Jambur Solar Power Station
