= University of the Gambia =

Public university based in Kanifing, The Gambia

Coordinates: 13°27′26″N 16°41′08″W

The University of The Gambia
- Motto in English: Knowledge, Truth, and Development
- Type: Public
- Established: 1998; 28 years ago
- Affiliations: St. Mary's College of Maryland; Alliance française Saint Mary's University (Halifax)
- Chancellor: President Adama Barrow
- Faculty: 435 (2025)
- Students: 8,000 approx (in October 2025)
- Location: Kanifing, The Gambia
- Campus: Kal Jawara Memorial Block (MDI), Kanifing South, Sere Kunda) Royal Victoria Teaching Hospital (Banjul) Gambia College (Brikama)
- Website: www.utg.edu.gm

The University of The Gambia (UTG) is a non-profit, co-educational public institution of higher education, emerging as The Gambia's first officially recognized tertiary institution, and fulfilling the longstanding desire to improve the educational landscape. Prior to this critical development, students often emigrated to Senegal or Europe for greater educational opportunities, both costly and rare, especially in the newly independent economy. Courses officially began in March 1999 following an Act of the National Assembly of The Gambia, which serves as the primary center for academic excellence in the country.

The UTG initially began operating from the Management Development Institute (MDI) in Kotu-Kanifing, the Edward Francis Small Teaching Hospital (formerly the Royal Victoria Teaching Hospital) in Banjul, and the Gambia College in Brikama, which served as affiliated sites for academic activities. However, in 2007, the Ministry of Higher Education, Research, and Technology (MoHERST) was established, with the stated aim of aiding The Gambia's socio-economic development through higher education. Their efforts successfully expanded opportunities, particularly in Farafenni and Faraba Banta. Since 1999, an additional 8 institutions and 79 accredited tertiary institutions, some directly linked to UGT and others independent, have opened.

As of September 2024, the total number of staff was ~695, with 435 serving in academic positions. By October 2025, the student population was roughly 8,000. The university offers 50 undergraduate programs and 17 graduate programs—with 5 being doctoral (PhD) programs. Their broad curriculum spans agricultural and environmental sciences, medicine and allied health sciences, law, business and public administration, education, engineering and architecture, amongst many other disciplines.

== History ==
The campus was founded in 1998 in Kotu-Kanifing, a suburb of Serekunda, as the country's first non-profit public university. However, it wasn't until March 1999 that courses became available, via a law passed by the National Assembly of the Gambia; that same year, 300 students were reportedly enrolled.

Under the leadership of former president Dawda K. Jawara, the People's Progressive Party (PPP) broadly cultivated the necessary long-term framework for higher education in The Gambia, including construction, faculty training, and program improvement. A feasibility study on higher education in the country, authored by the African Development Bank Group (AfDB), informed the government's ambitions to gradually establish a national university. Eventual political interference, most notably from former president Yahya Jammeh and the Alliance for Patriotic Reorientation and Construction (APRC), ignited mixed reviews; despite his contributions, it's reported that in 2001, Yahya Jammeh's government conducted extrajudicial killings at the university.

After roughly two decades, the Gambian government, under President Adama Barrow, erected a new campus at Faraba Banta. Lot 1 was inaugurated on March 2, 2024, comprising four schools: Business and Public Administration, Information and Communication Technology, Education, and Arts and Science. They're collectively capable of accommodating ~3,500 students, while the Dr. Alieu Badara Joof library (named after the late former Vice President) has a capacity of 1,200. Lot 2, inaugurated on December 27, 2025, includes the Faculty of Law, School of Agriculture and Environmental Science, and the Chancery building. Additionally, MoHERST, in collaboration with the Islamic Development Bank (IsDB), has unveiled plans for Lot 3, which will house the School of Medicine and Allied Health Sciences, expected to accommodate 6,600 students, substantially strengthening the country's capability to train healthcare personnel.

=== Administration ===
UTG has an intricate structural hierarchy designed to balance ceremonial, academic, and operational responsibilities. The president of The Gambia is recognized as ceremonial chancellor, a deeply symbolic and constitutional role presiding over official convocation, conferring honorary degrees, and directing meetings of governing bodies as required. The vice-chancellor, technically the CEO, is responsible for academic and administrative leadership, directing statutory committees, and ensuring adequate legal compliance. The chief director of operations (CDO), analogous to the chief operating officer (COO), serves as the executive for all non-academic functions. These managerial roles, alongside other positions (i.e., deans, registrars, directors), vastly comprise the UTG academic framework.

=== University of The Gambia Students' Union ===
The University of The Gambia Students' Union (UTGSU) is a students' union formally established in 2016 under Section 42 of the Tertiary and Higher Education Act, serving to further academic pursuits and advocate for equality as an open society. It's currently the predominant representative society at UTG, with specialized sub-associations, locally recognized as UTG Faculty Base Associations (TGFBA), functioning as affiliated units.

== Growth and Development ==
By 2002, academic enrollment had increased along with staff; by 2006, the UTG had nearly 2,000 students, illustrating rapid expansion in both programs and infrastructure ; by 2025, the UTG had ~8,000 registered students and successfully delivered 50 undergraduate programs and 17 graduate programs—5 being PhD programs, highlighting the substantially positive national impact. UTG is ranked 1st in the Gambia, this ranking is based on the outstanding contributions of its alumni, research output and non- academic activities.

=== Administration ===
UTG has an intricate structural hierarchy designed to balance ceremonial, academic, and operational responsibilities. The President of The Gambia is recognized as Ceremonial Chancellor, a deeply symbolic and constitutional role presiding over official convocation, conferring honorary degrees, and directing meetings of governing bodies as required. The Vice-Chancellor, technically the CEO, is responsible for academic and administrative leadership, directing statutory committees, and ensuring adequate legal compliance. The Chief Director of Operations (CDO), analogous to the chief operating officer (COO), serves as the executive for all non-academic functions. These managerial roles, alongside other positions (i.e., Deans, Registrars, Directors), vastly comprise the UTG academic framework.

=== University of The Gambia Students' Union ===
The University of The Gambia Students' Union (UTGSU) is a students' union formally established in 2016 under Section 42 of the Tertiary and Higher Education Act, serving to further academic pursuits and advocate for equality as an open society. It's currently the predominant representative society at UTG, with specialized sub-associations, locally recognized as UTG Faculty Base Associations (TGFBA), functioning as affiliated units.

== Role in public health ==
On October 11, 2012, it was reported that the UTG has started two master's degree programs in public health, in collaboration with the University of Illinois at Springfield and the University of Iowa. According to Vaccine News Daily:

"Rex Kuye, the head of the public health department, said that the two programs were conceived of locally to address growing health concerns in the Gambia. The Gambia has made many public health strides in the last two decades. The nation was certified as polio-free in 2004 and has had no confirmed polio cases since that time. The success in the battle against polio resulted from high political commitment and routine polio immunization coverage of more than 90 percent since 1990, according to the Foroyaa Newspaper."

== Faculties ==
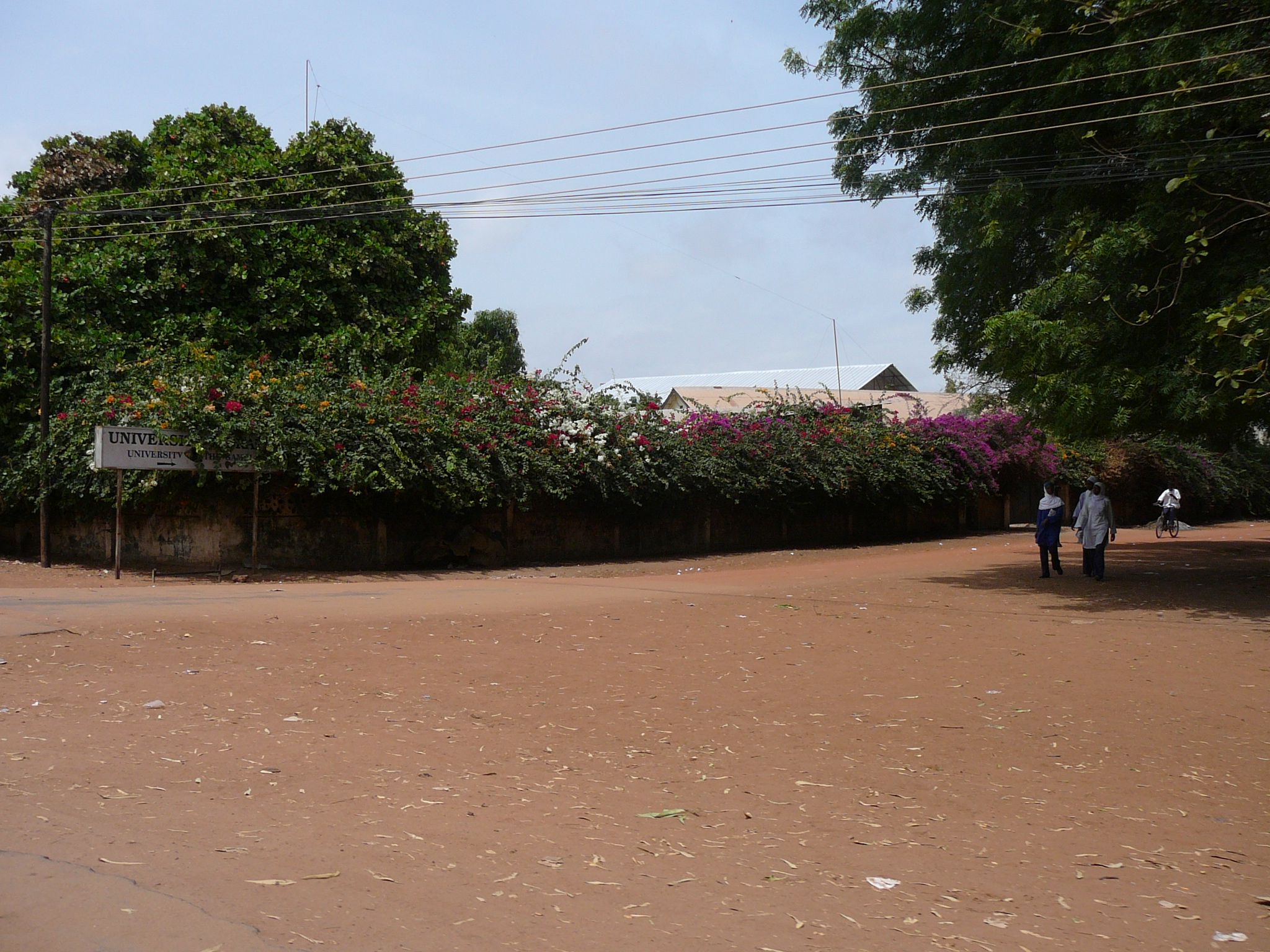
A signpost at Kairaba Avenue in Latrikunda (a suburb of Serekunda) directs to the University of The Gambia.

The UTG is composed of several schools:

- School of Agriculture and Environment Sciences, Faraba Banta Campus
- School of Arts and Sciences, Faraba Banta Campus
- School of Business and Public Administration, Faraba Banta Campus
- School of Education, Faraba Banta Campus
- Faculty of Law, Kanifing
- School of Journalism and Digital Media, Kanifing
- School of Engineering and Architecture, Banjul
- School of Medicine and Allied Health Sciences, Banjul
- School of Information communication and Technology, Faraba Banta Campus
- School of Graduate Studies and Research, Kanifing
- UTG Digital Campus
- UTG North Bank Campus, Farafenni

== Academic Catalog ==
Below is a comprehensive list of offered programs at UTG. The provided list may not be accurately updated.

=== Undergraduate programs ===
An undergraduate degree is the first level of higher education that students pursue after senior secondary school. The two main types are associate's degrees (2 years) and bachelor's degrees (3-4 years, though some countries offer 5-year programs).

==== Arts and Sciences ====
- Bachelor of Arts in English
- Bachelor of Arts in French
- Bachelor of Arts in Islamic Studies
- Bachelor of Arts in Development Studies
- Bachelor of Arts in Christian Religious Studies
- Bachelor of Arts in History
- Bachelor of Arts in Political Science
- Bachelor of Science in Biology
- Bachelor of Science in Mathematics
- Bachelor of Science in Chemistry
- Bachelor of Science in Physics

==== Agriculture and Environmental Sciences ====
- Bachelor of Science in Agriculture
- Bachelor of Science in Environmental Science

==== Business and Public Administration ====
- Bachelor of Arts in Public Administration
- Bachelor of Science in Accountancy
- Bachelor of Science in Management
- Bachelor of Science in Economics
- Bachelor of Science in Banking and Finance
- Bachelor of Science in Marketing
- Bachelor of Science in Tourism and Hospitality

==== Education ====
- Bachelor of Education in English Language
- Bachelor of Education in Architecture
- Bachelor of Education in French
- Bachelor of Education in Economics
- Bachelor of Education in Arabic
- Bachelor of Education in Geography
- Bachelor of Education in History
- Bachelor of Education in Biology
- Bachelor of Education in Mathematics
- Bachelor of Education in Chemistry
- Bachelor of Education in Physics

==== Medicine and Allied Health Sciences ====
- Bachelor of Medicine/Chirurgiae Baccalaureus in Medicine
- Bachelor of Science in Nursing and Reproductive Health
- Bachelor of Science in Public Health and Environmental Health

==== Information and Communication Technology ====
- Bachelor of Science in Computer Science
- Bachelor of Science in Information Technology

==== Journalism and Digital Media ====
- Bachelor of Science in Journalism

==== Engineering and Architecture ====
- Bachelor of Community Building and Design

==== Law ====
- Bachelor of Laws

=== Graduate programs ===
A graduate degree is the second level of higher education that students pursue after undergraduate school. The two main types are a master's degree (1-2 years with an undergraduate degree, 6 years without an undergraduate degree) and a doctoral degree (3-10 years, depending on your major).

- Master of Science in Mathematics
- Master of Science in Agronomy
- Master of Science in Chemistry
- Master of Science in Biology
- Master of Science in Physics
- Master of Science in International Relations and Diplomacy
- Master of Science in Economics
- Master of Science in Business Administration
- Master of Science in Crop Science
- Master of Science in Nursing
- Master of Science in Accounting and Finance
- Master of Science in Computer Science and Telecommunications
- Master of Science in Public Administration
- Master of Science in Environmental Chemistry and Pollution Control
- Master of Public Health in Health Improvement and Development
- Master of Science in Public Health in Environmental & Occupational Health
- Master of Arts in History
- Master of Arts in English
- Master of Arts in French
- Master of Laws
- West African Science Service Center on Climate Change and Adapted Land Use
- Certificate in Climate Change Program

==== Doctorate Programs ====
- Doctor of Philosophy in Biology
- Doctor of Philosophy in Agronomy
- Doctor of Philosophy in Public Administration
- Doctor of Philosophy in Law
- Doctor of Philosophy in African History

== Academic Staff ==
Past and present staff at the UTG include the following:

=== Chancellors ===
- President Adama Barrow

=== Vice Chancellors ===
- Prof. Donald E.U. Ekong, former Vice Chancellor (1999-2015)
- Prof. Andreas Ludvig Steigen, former Vice Chancellor (2005-2008)
- Prof. Muhammadou M.O. Kah, former Vice Chancellor (2009-2015)
- Prof. Fakir Muhammad Anjum, former Vice Chancellor (2012-2016)
- Prof. Herbert Robinson, Vice Chancellor of the University of The Gambia

=== Executive Leadership ===
- Dr. William Jabang, Chief Director of Operations
- Prof. Ousman Nyam, former Deputy Vice Chancellor
- Prof. Kayode S. Adekeye, Deputy Vice Chancellor

=== Deans ===
- Dr. Lamin K. M. Fatty, Dean of the School of Agriculture and Environmental Sciences
- Dr. Pierre Gomez, Dean of the School of Arts and Sciences
- Prof. Banna Sawaneh, Dean of the School of Business and Public Administration
- Dr. Ousainou Sarr, Dean of the School of Education
- Dr. Melchizedec J. Onobe, Dean of the School of Journalism and Digital Media
- Mrs. Betha J. Johnson, Dean of the School of Engineering and Architecture
- Prov. Gabriel Olabiyi Ogun, Dean of the School of Medicine and Allied Health Sciences
- Dr. Mbemba Hydara, Dean of the School of Information and Communications Technology
- Prof. Raphael Kolade Ayeni, Dean of the School of Graduate Studies

=== Directors and Registrars ===
- Dr. Aidara, Human Resource Director
- Prof. Bede Onyemaechi Okorie, Head of the Department of Faculty of Law
- Dr. Lamin B. Ceesay, former Head of the School of Business and Public Administration
- Dr. Mbakeh Camara, Director of International Relations
- Dr. Habibatou Drammeh, former Director of Student Affairs
- Dr. Sidat Yaffa, Director of West African Science Center on Climate Change and Adapted Land Use (WASCAL)
- Mr. Ousainou Corr, Director of Finance
- Mr. Alieu Darboe, Director of Facilities and Auxiliary Services
- Dr. Lang Sanyang, Director of Research and Consultancy
- Dr. Aminta Njie, Director of Admission and Financial Aid
- Mr. Pa Sara Drammeh, Acting Information Technologies Director
- Dr. Momodou Lamin Tarro, Registrar of the University of the Gambia
- Bobo Baldeh, Acting Registrar

=== Lecturers ===
- Dr. Gabriel Bajie, lecturer in the School of Business and Public Administration
- Prof. Pierre Gomez, former DVC Academy
- Prof. Kayode Adekeye, former DVC Academy
- Associate Prof. Christopher Belford, lecturer in the School of Business and Public Administration
- Musu Bakoto Sawo, lecturer in international human rights law and winner of the "2020 African of the Year Award" from Daily Trust
- Rex Kuye, lecturer in the School of Public and Environmental Health
- Associate Prof. Jainaba Sey-Sawo, lecturer in the School of Nursing and Reproductive Health
- Alhaji Alieu Ebrima Charm Joof, lecturer in History
- Saja Taal, lecturer in Political Science
- Bukhari M.S. Sillah, lecturer in Economics

== See also ==
- List of universities in the Gambia
