= Kabafita Forest Park =

Protected area in the Gambia

- IUCN category IV (habitat/species management area)
- Interactive map of Kabafita Forest Park
- Location: Western Division Gambia
- Nearest city: Brikama
- Coordinates: 13°18′N 16°39′W
- Area: 243 ha (600 acres)
- Established: January 1, 1954

Kabafita Forest Park is a forest park in the Gambia. Established on January 1, 1954, it covers 243 hectares.

The estimate terrain elevation above sea level is 38 metres.

This area is used, among other things, for the production of firewood through afforestation with fast-growing coniferous wood.

There are also mango plantations here.

The following bird species can be observed in Kabafita: Silver eagle (Aquila wahlbergi), African tree falcon ( Falco cuvierii ), golden cuckoo (Chrysococcyx caprius), tree hop (Phoeniculidae), large honey indicator ( Indicator indicator ), gray-breasted woodpecker (Dendropicosecht goertae), whistle-warbler (Cisticola lateralis) and African black-eared orioles (Oriolus auratus).
