= Nymbai Forest Park =

- IUCN category IV (habitat/species management area)
- Interactive map of Nymbai Forest Park
- Location: Western Division Gambia
- Nearest city: Brikama
- Coordinates: 13°18′0″N 16°40′10″W
- Area: 202 ha (500 acres)
- Established: January 1, 1954

Nymbai Forest Park is a forest park in the Gambia. Established on January 1, 1954, it covers 202 hectares.

It is located at an elevation of 28 meters above sea level.
