= Kiang (The Gambia) =

Historical kingdom in the Gambia

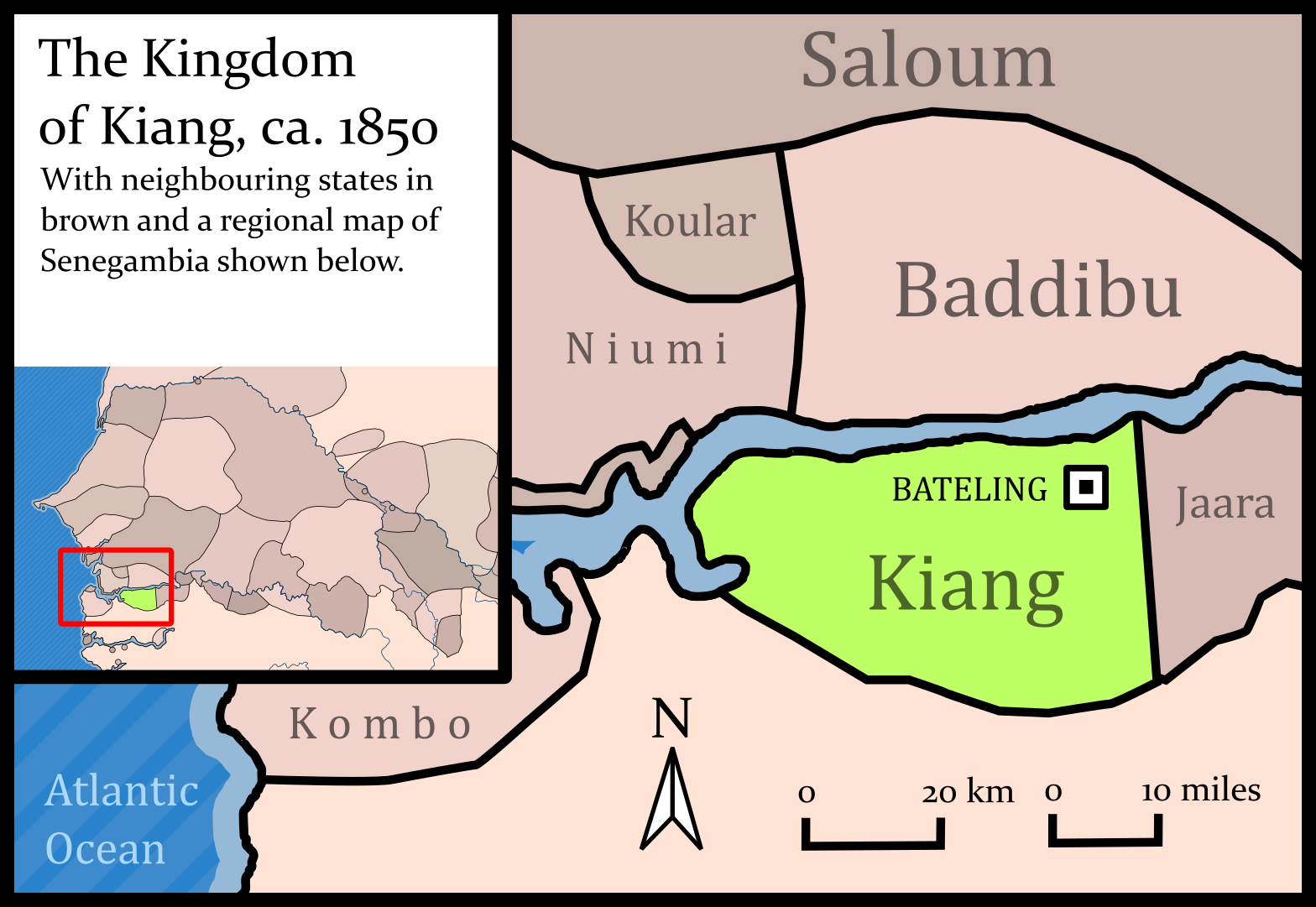
A map of the Kingdom of Kiang and its neighbours ca. 1850.

Kiang (variant spelling: Kian) was a historical kingdom in what is now the West African state of The Gambia and also the name of the region it covered. The area is now the districts of Kiang Central, Kiang East, and Kiang West in the Lower River Division of the present-day country. The Kiang West National Park is also on the territory of the former empire.

== History ==
The kingdom was one of nine Mandinka states on the southern bank of the Gambia River in the early 19th century. It stretched in the west from where the Bintang Bolong joins the Gambia to the east to the point known as Devil Point, around ten kilometers from Soma. It was separated from Fogny to the west by the Bintang Bolong. In the east it bordered on Jarra Empire.

The towns of Tankular and Tendaba were the main ports on the Gambia, where Europeans also traded.
