= Geography of the Gambia =

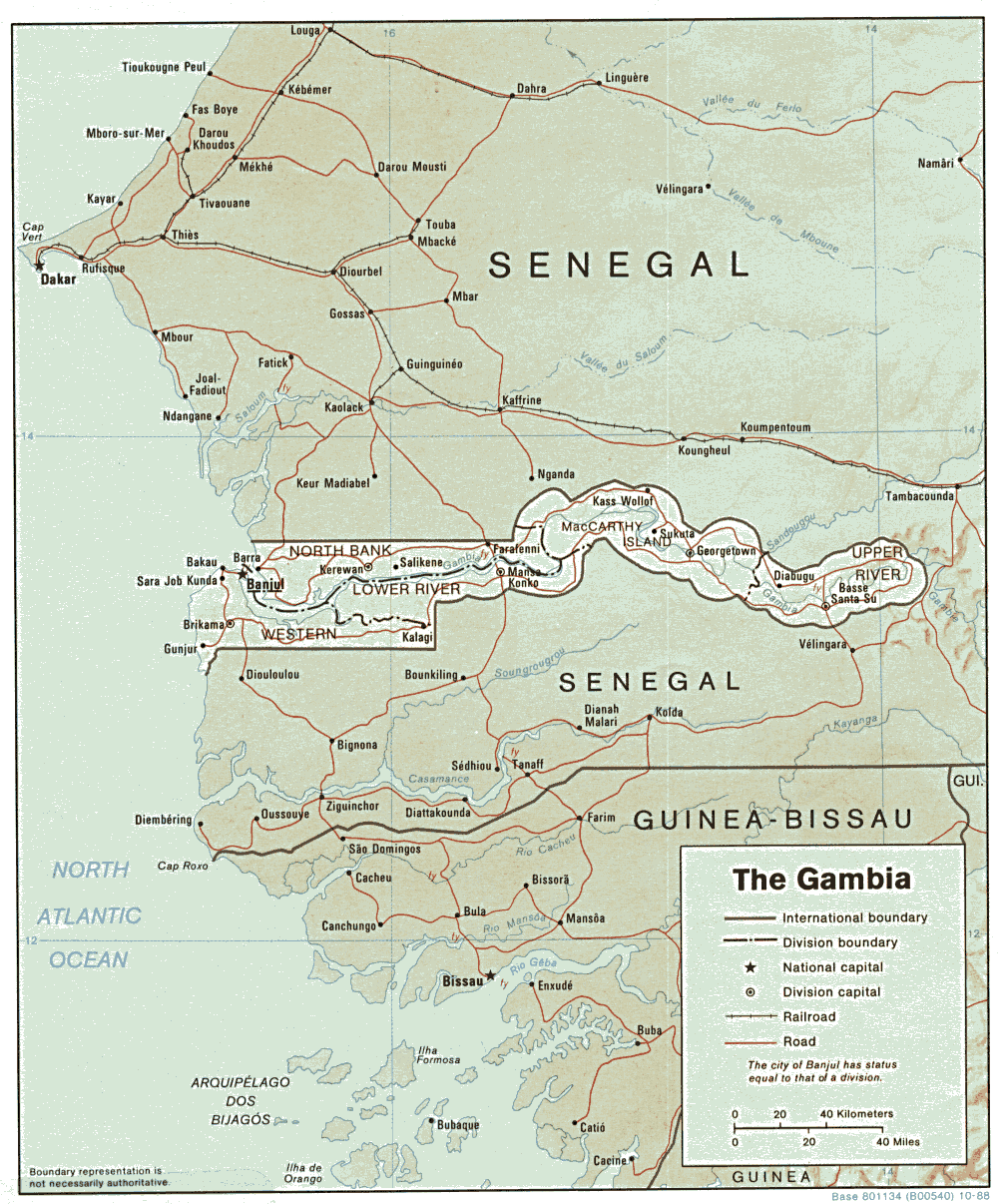
Map of the Gambia

Location of the Gambia (in circle)

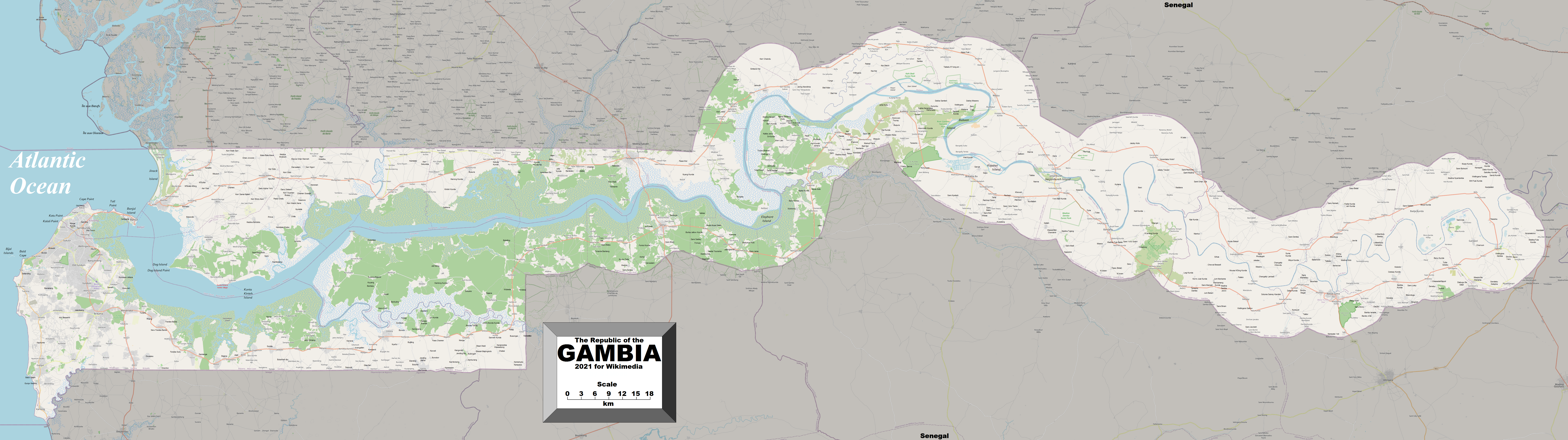
Enlargeable, detailed map of the Gambia

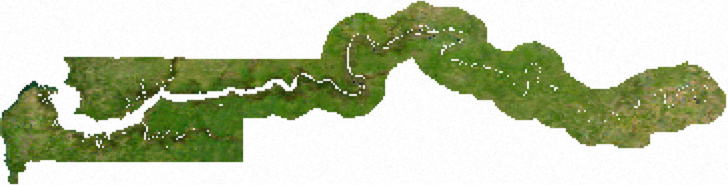
Satellite image of The Gambia

The Gambia is a very small and narrow African country with the border based on the Gambia River. The country is less than 48 kilometres (30 mi) wide at its greatest width. The country's present boundaries were defined in 1889 after an agreement between the United Kingdom and France. It is often claimed by Gambians that the distance of the borders from the Gambia River corresponds to the area that British naval cannon of the time could reach from the river's channel. However, there is no historical evidence to support the story, and the border was actually delineated using careful surveying methods by the Franco-British boundary commission. The Gambia is almost an enclave of Senegal and is the smallest country on mainland Africa.

== Terrain ==
The grassy flood plain of the Gambia river contains Guinean mangroves near the coast, and becomes West Sudanian savanna upriver inland.

== Statistics ==
Location: Western Africa, bordering the North Atlantic Ocean and Senegal

Geographic coordinates: 13°28′N 16°34′W

Area:
total: 11,295 km^{2}
land: 10,000 km^{2}
water: 1,295 km^{2}

- comparative: slightly less than Jamaica; slightly less than twice the size of Delaware

Land boundaries:
total: 749 km
border countries: Senegal 749 km

Coastline: 80 km

Maritime claims:

- territorial sea: 12 nmi (22.2 km; 13.8 mi)
- contiguous zone: 18 nmi (33.3 km; 20.7 mi)
- exclusive fishing zone: 200 nmi (370.4 km; 230.2 mi)
- continental shelf: extent not specified

Köppen–Geiger climate classification map at 1-km resolution for the Gambia (1991–2020)

Climate: tropical; hot, rainy season (June to November); cooler, dry season (November to May)

Terrain: floodplain of the Gambia River, flanked by low hills

Elevation extremes:

- lowest point: Atlantic Ocean 0 m
- highest point: at least 53 m according to The World Factbook and a 1966 map by U.S. National Imagery and Mapping Agency, 64 m based on SRTM data calculated by peakbagger.com between Sabi and the Senegalese village Vélingara (13.22159°N 14.15974°W), located in a sandy plateau at the border with Senegal

Natural resources: fish, clay, silica sand, titanium (rutile and ilmenite), tin, zircon

Land use:
arable land: 43.48%
permanent crops: 0.49%
other: 56.03% (2011)

- Irrigated land: 50 km^{2} (2011)
- Total renewable water resources: 8 km^{3} (2011)
- Freshwater withdrawal (domestic/industrial/agricultural):
  total: 0.09 km^{3}/yr (41%/21%/39%)
  per capita: 65.77 m^{3}/yr (2005)

Current issues: deforestation, desertification, prevalence of water-borne diseases, drought (rainfall has dropped by 30% in the last 30 years)

Environment - party to international agreements on:

- biodiversity, climate change, Kyoto Protocol, desertification, endangered species, hazardous wastes, law of the sea, ozone layer protection, ship pollution, wetland, whaling

== Extreme points ==
This is a list of the extreme points of the Gambia, the points that are farther north, south, east or west than any other location.

- Northernmost point – unnamed location on the border with Senegal immediately south of the Senegalese village of Keur Mali Makham, Central River Division
- Easternmost point – unnamed point on the border with Senegal near the village of Sembagne, Upper River Division
- Southernmost point – the point at which the border with Senegal enters the Atlantic Ocean at the mouth of the Allahein River, Western Division
- Westernmost point - Bijol Islands, Western Division
- Westernmost point (mainland) - Solifor Point, Western Division

== Forests ==
=== Tree cover extent and loss ===
Global Forest Watch publishes annual estimates of tree cover loss and 2000 tree cover extent derived from time-series analysis of Landsat satellite imagery in the Global Forest Change dataset. In this framework, tree cover refers to vegetation taller than 5 m (including natural forests and tree plantations), and tree cover loss is defined as the complete removal of tree cover canopy for a given year, regardless of cause.

For the Gambia, country statistics report cumulative tree cover loss of 733 ha (7.33 km^{2}) from 2001 to 2024 (about 16.1% of its 2000 tree cover area). For tree cover density greater than 30%, country statistics report a 2000 tree cover extent of 4,563 ha (45.63 km^{2}). The charts and table below display this data. In simple terms, the annual loss number is the area where tree cover disappeared in that year, and the extent number shows what remains of the 2000 tree cover baseline after subtracting cumulative loss. Forest regrowth is not included in the dataset.

Annual tree cover loss in the Gambia, 2001–2024. View chart definition.
Tree cover extent in 2000 minus cumulative tree cover loss in the Gambia, 2001–2024 (loss-only residual; does not account for gain). View chart definition.

Annual tree cover extent and loss
Year	Tree cover extent (km2) (Note: This residual measure does not include forest regrowth.)	Annual tree cover loss (km2)
2001	45.60	0.03
2002	45.19	0.41
2003	45.08	0.11
2004	44.45	0.63
2005	44.40	0.05
2006	44.33	0.07
2007	43.84	0.49
2008	40.86	2.98
2009	40.77	0.09
2010	40.53	0.24
2011	40.23	0.30
2012	39.82	0.41
2013	39.70	0.12
2014	39.53	0.17
2015	39.43	0.10
2016	39.38	0.05
2017	39.30	0.08
2018	39.24	0.06
2019	39.03	0.21
2020	38.93	0.10
2021	38.75	0.18
2022	38.58	0.17
2023	38.46	0.12
2024	38.30	0.16

== Gallery ==
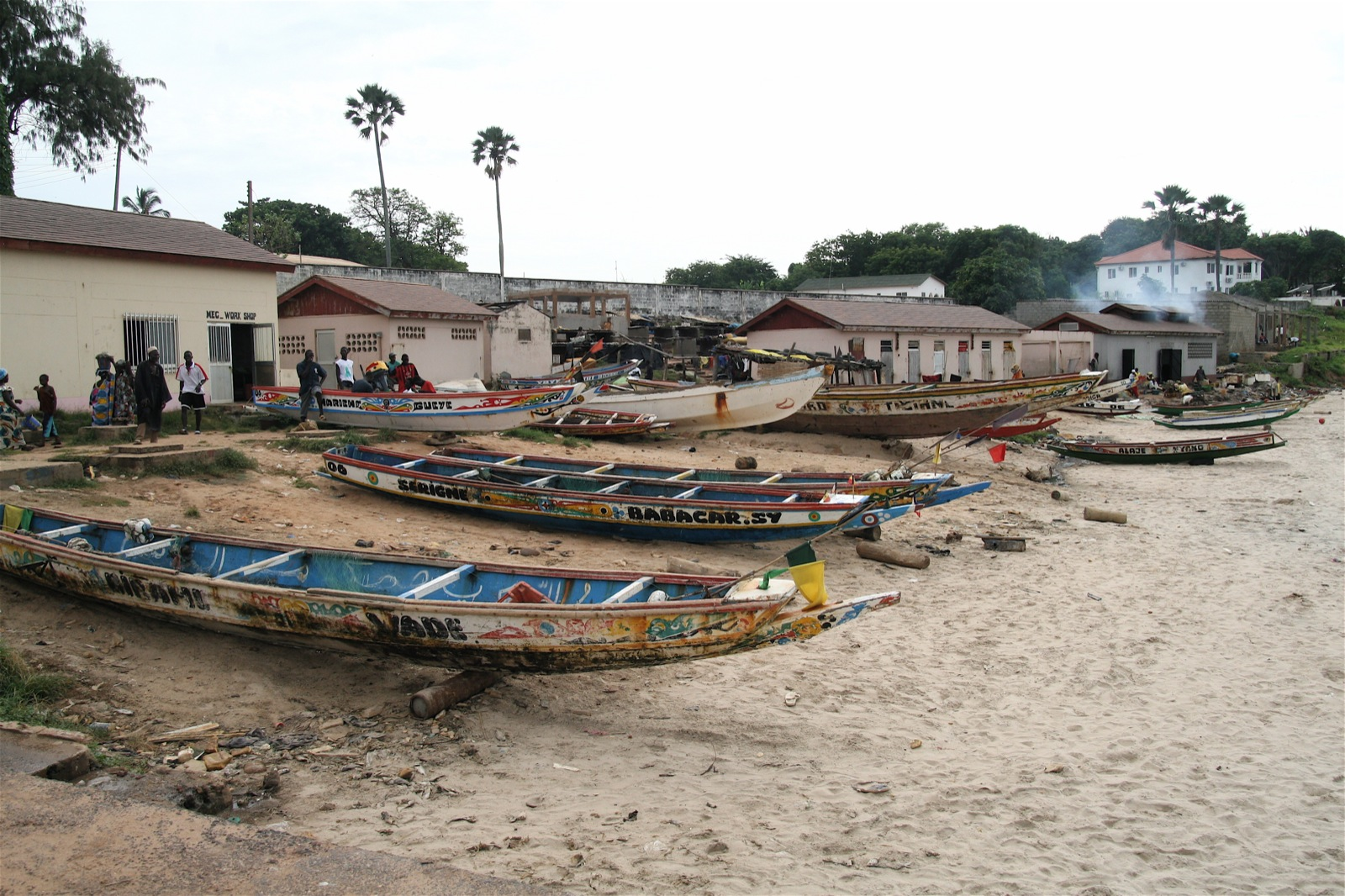
Fishing boats in Bakau, Gambia

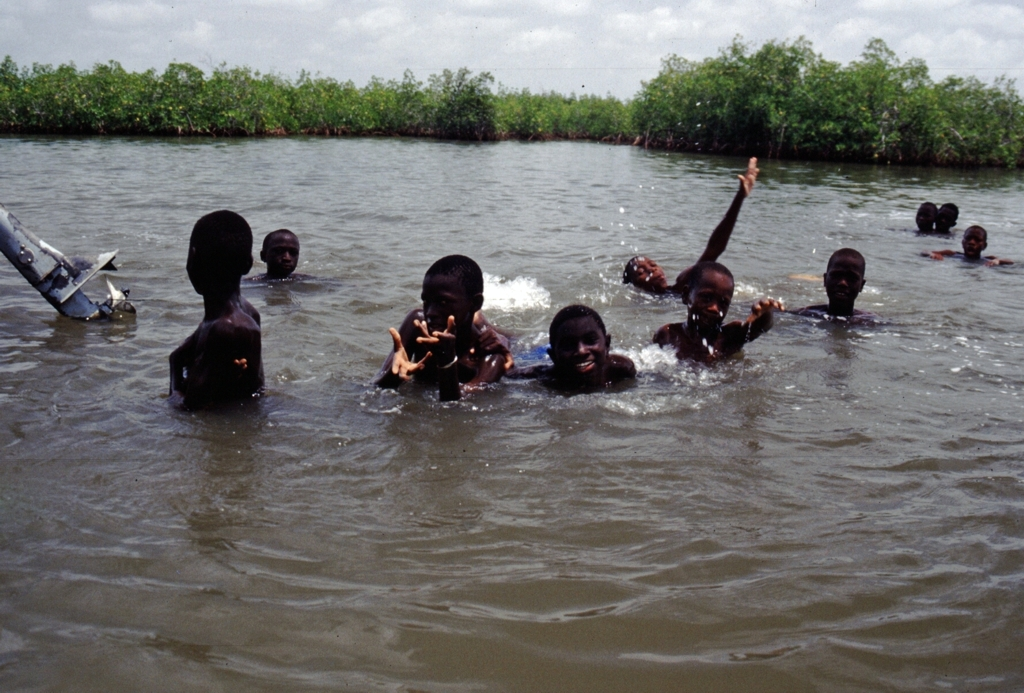
Children swimming near Lamin Lodge.

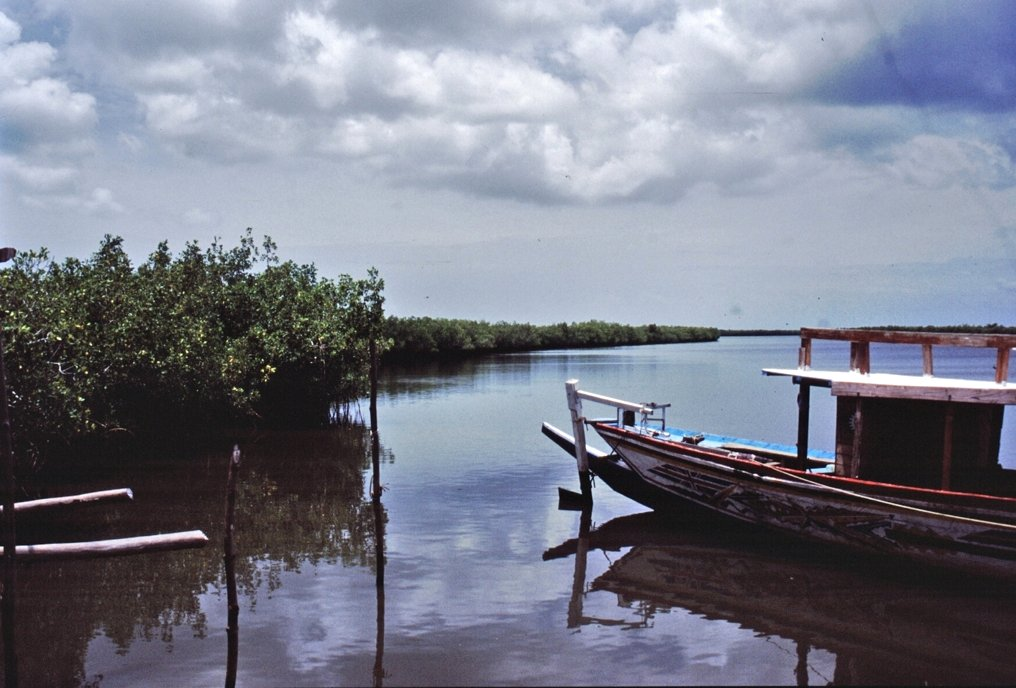
The river.

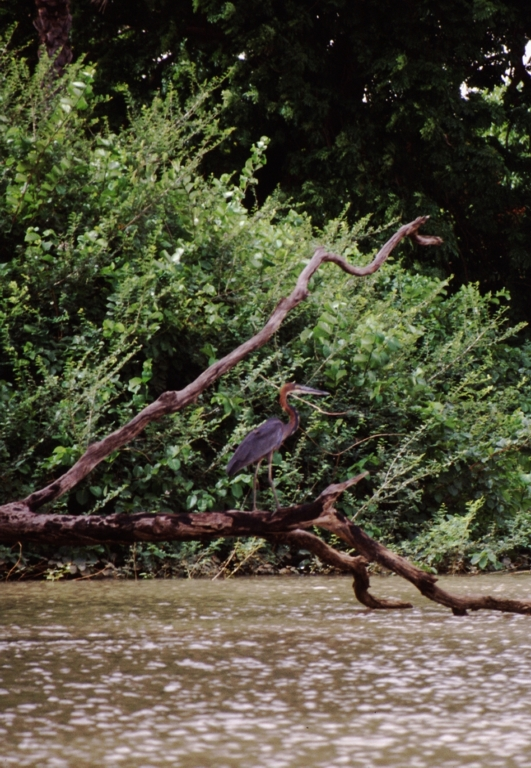
River bird

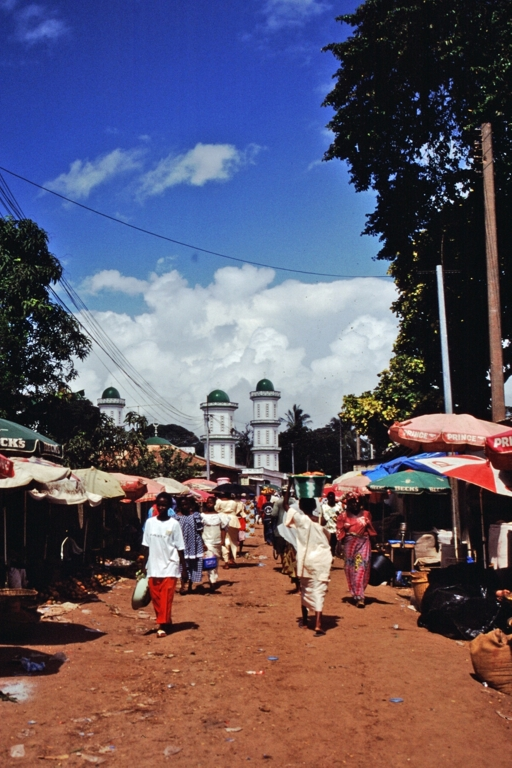
A market.

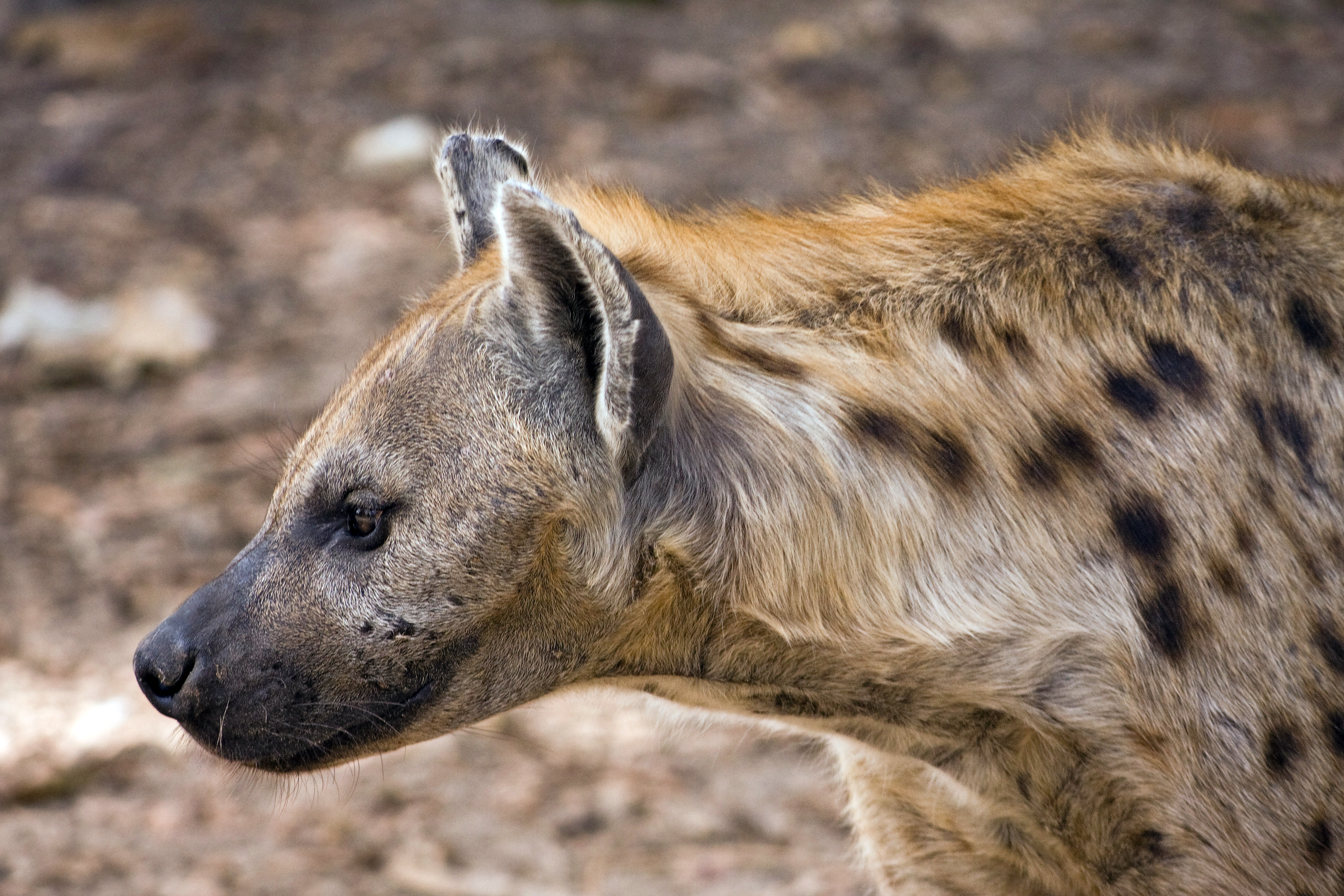
The Spotted hyena is part of the Gambian fauna.

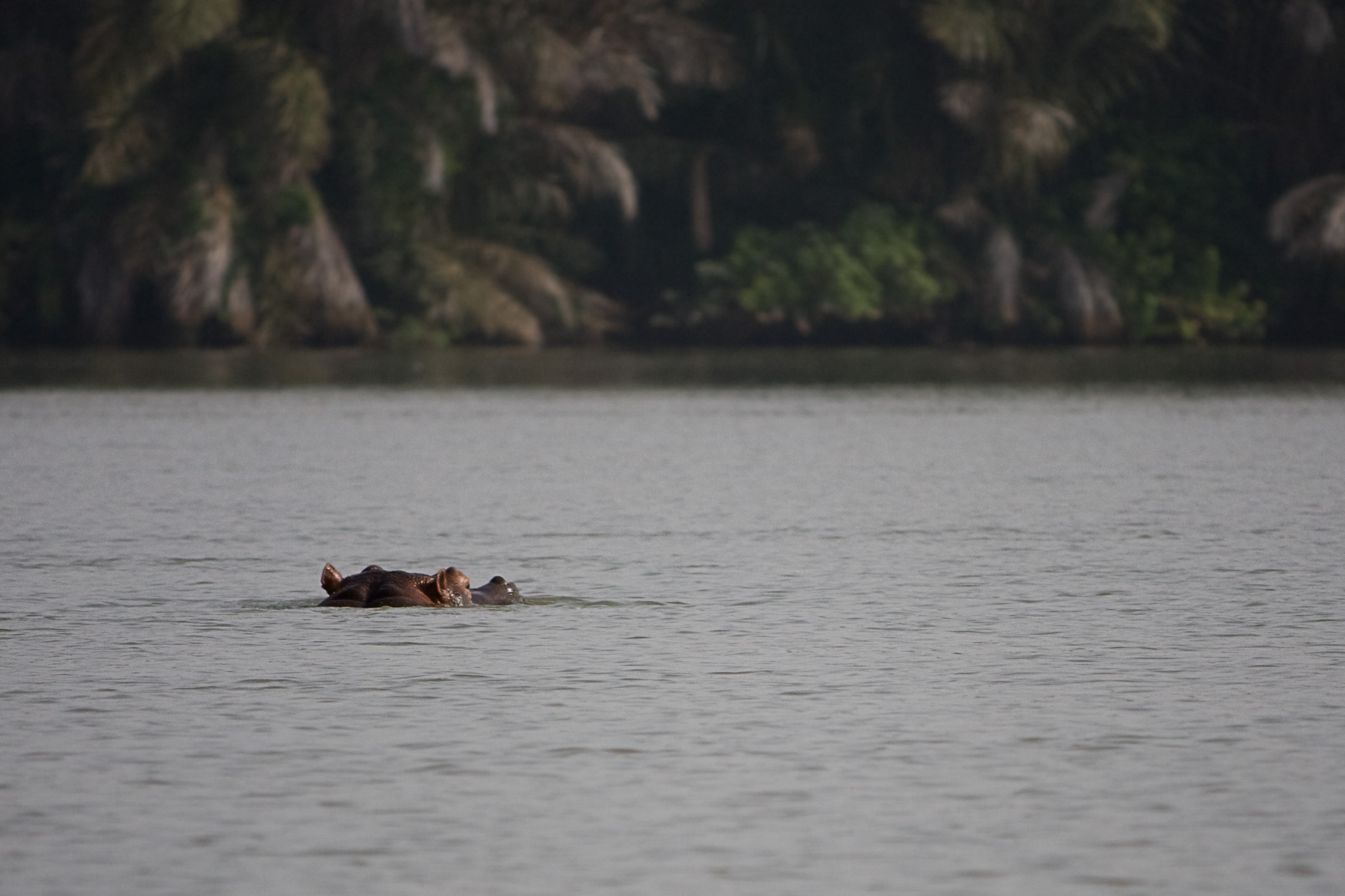
Wild hippopotamus in the Gambia River.

== See also ==
- Districts of the Gambia
