= Brufut =

- Location in the Gambia
- Coordinates: 13°23′N 16°45′W
- Country: The Gambia
- Division: Western Division
- Time zone: UTC+0 (GMT)

Brufut is a town located in the Western Division of the Gambia. The town of Brufut is situated a couple of kilometres inland from the coastal road, but the name Brufut is applied to an area extending from around the town, out to the coast. It has a main street with a market, and some government offices, it is reached via a 'red' sandy unmade road from the coastal road, from Brusabi on one side to Ghana Town on the other side. The area is a fast developing location because of its highly developed infra structure. It is easy to reach from the capital, Banjul, the economic centre, Serrekunda, and the tourist area of the Sennegambia Strip by the AU Coastal Highway from the turntable in Brusabi going towards Tanjii and situated on a slight hill giving direct views to the unspoiled sandy beaches and the Atlantic Ocean.

Close to the coastline and opposite the Sheraton Hotel is a large (to be gated) estate - TAF Brufut Gardens, with large luxury villas for the well-off and includes several embassies, as well as guarded houses for ministers and the some members of the judiciary, approximately one third are occupied all year. The estate is very popular with UK expatriates. There will eventually be approximately 450 villas (parts of the estate are still under construction in 2013), that include three large apartment blocks and a brand new Shopping Mall. Next to this is another gated and guarded area of the estate known as the AU Village, which was constructed in early 2006 by the Gambia/Government and TAF Africa Global purposely to have a secure place to lodge the 52 presidents expected to attend the then 7th AU summit in the Gambia. Today these are used to lodge VIPs and are for sale to the general public. The area, this village is built on is next to a holy place called Sanmentereng. It has a long cultural background being a "holy" area where people came to in order to pray for their future hopes and wishes to come true.
