= Furnya Forest Park =

- IUCN category IV (habitat/species management area)
- Interactive map of Furnya Forest Park
- Location: Western Division Gambia
- Nearest city: Brikama
- Coordinates: 13°16′6″N 16°36′31″W
- Area: 405 ha (1,000 acres)
- Established: January 1, 1954

Furnya Forest Park is a forest park in the Gambia. Established on January 1, 1954, it covers 405 hectares.

It is located south of South Bank Road, Gambia's main highway, around four kilometers from Brikama city center. The approximately 2.7 wide and 2.9 kilometers long area extends in the west to the settlement areas of Brikama. In the east, the area is bounded by the trunk road that leads to the south as the Senegalese N5 to Bignona.
