= List of universities and colleges in the Gambia =

Overview of Gambian universities and colleges

This is a list of universities and colleges in The Gambia.

== Universities ==
- American International University West Africa
- EUCLID University
- University of the Gambia
- International Open University
- University of applied science engineering and technology USET
- University of Education the Gambia UEG

== Colleges ==
- International Community College
- The Gambia College

== Other institutions ==
- Gambia Tourism and Hospitality Institute (GTHI)
- Gambia Technical Training Institute (GTTI)
- International Business College
- Management Development Institute (MDI)
- Rural Development Institute (RDI)
- Suna Institute of Science and Technology (SIST)
- Interlink Global College
- Insight Training Center
- Gambia Public Procurement Institute
