= Brikama Forest Park =

- IUCN category IV (habitat/species management area)
- Interactive map of Brikama Forest Park
- Location: Lower River Division Gambia
- Nearest city: Soma
- Coordinates: 13°23′2″N 15°50′2″W
- Area: 357 ha (880 acres)
- Established: January 1, 1954

Brikama Forest Park is a forest park in the Gambia. Established on January 1, 1954, it covers 357 hectares.

It is located at an altitude of 18 meters.
