= Bamakuno Forest Park =

Protected area in the Gambia

- Interactive map of Bamakuno Forest Park
- Location: Gambia
- Nearest city: Brikama
- Coordinates: 13°12′31″N 16°25′54″W
- Area: 1,092 ha (2,700 acres)
- Established: January 1, 1954

Bamakuno Forest Park, or Bama Kuno, is a forest park in the Gambia. Established on January 1, 1954, it covers 1092 hectares. It is located 25 km to the south east of Brikama town in The Gambia.

Many species of birds live in the park.
