= Kaiaf Forest Park =

- IUCN category IV (habitat/species management area)
- Interactive map of Kaiaf Forest Park
- Location: Lower River Division Gambia
- Nearest city: Soma
- Coordinates: 13°24′41″N 15°36′44″W
- Area: 26 ha (64 acres)
- Established: January 1, 1954

Kaiaf Forest Park is a forest park in the Gambia. Established on January 1, 1954, it covers 26 hectares.

The estimate terrain elevation above sea level is 20 metres.
