= Faraba Banta =

- Location in the Gambia
- Coordinates: 13°16′N 16°31′W
- Country: The Gambia
- Division: Western Division
- District: Kombo East

Population (2009)
  - Total: 3,626 (est.)

Faraba Banta is a small town in south-western Gambia. It is located in Kombo East District in the Western Division. As of 2009, it has an estimated population of 3,626. The town was the site of the Faraba shooting on 18 June 2018.
