= Beri Kolon Forest Park =

Protected area

- IUCN category IV (habitat/species management area)
- Interactive map of Beri Kolon Forest Park
- Location: Lower River Division Gambia
- Nearest city: Soma
- Coordinates: 13°23′55″N 15°20′4″W
- Area: 1,052 ha (2,600 acres)
- Established: January 1, 1954

Beri Kolon Forest Park, or Berikolon, is a forest park in the Gambia. Established on January 1, 1954, it covers 1052 hectares.

It is located in the Lower River Region in the Jarra Central District and Jarra East District, on the north side of South Bank Road, Gambia's main trunk road, around 15 miles east of the next larger town, Soma.
