= Ghana Town =

Town in The Gambia

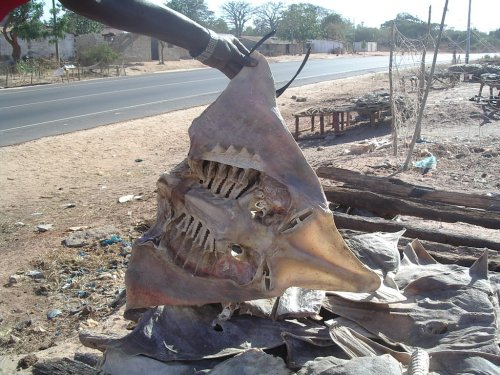

- Location in the Gambia
- Coordinates: 13°23′N 16°46′W
- Country: The Gambia
- Division: Western Division
- District: Kombo North/Saint Mary

Population (2024)
  - Total: 1,500 (est.)

Ghana Town is a small coastal fishing town in western Gambia. It is located in Kombo North/Saint Mary District in the Western Division. As of 2024, it had an estimated population of approximately 1,500.

Ghana town was established in the Gambia in the year 1961 by fishermen from the Ghana who wanted to go fishing in Senegal but later ended in Gambia.
