= JSPS =

JSPS may refer to:

- Jambur Solar Power Station, a power station in the Gambia
- Japan Society for the Promotion of Science, an institution in Japan
