= Nyanaberi Forest Park =

- IUCN category IV (habitat/species management area)
- Interactive map of Nyanaberi Forest Park
- Location: Lower River Division Gambia
- Nearest city: Soma
- Coordinates: 13°25′0″N 15°28′0″W
- Area: 1,198 ha (2,960 acres)
- Established: January 1, 1954

Nyanaberi Forest Park is a forest park in the Gambia. Established on January 1, 1954, it covers 1198 hectares.

It is located in Lower River, Gambia. The estimate terrain elevation above sea level is 32 metres.
