= Amdalai =

- Location in the Gambia
- Coordinates: 13°25′55″N 16°43′21″W
- Country: Gambia
- Division: Western Division
- District: Kombo North/Saint Mary

Population (2008)
  - Total: 1,245
- Time zone: UTC±00:00 (GMT)

Amdalai is a town in western Gambia. It is located in Kombo North/Saint Mary District in the Western Division. As of 2008, it has an estimated population of 1,245.
