= Tambajang Forest Park =

Protected area in the Gambia

- IUCN category IV (habitat/species management area)
- Location within The Gambia
- Location: Lower River Division, Gambia
- Nearest city: Soma
- Coordinates: 13°22′52″N 15°20′24″W
- Area: 752 ha (1,860 acres)
- Established: January 1, 1954

Tambajang Forest Park is a Forest Park in the Gambia. Established on January 1, 1954, it covers 752 hectares.

It occupies a position in the Low River region at an altitude of 33 meters.
