= Si-Kunda Forest Park =

- IUCN category IV (habitat/species management area)
- Interactive map of Si-Kunda Forest Park
- Location: Central River Division, Gambia
- Nearest city: Soma
- Coordinates: 13°37′23″N 15°17′24″W
- Area: 445 ha (1,100 acres)
- Established: January 1, 1954

Si-Kunda Forest Park is a forest park in the Gambia. Established on January 1, 1954, it covers 445 hectares.

It is located in the Central River area at an estimated altitude of 18 meters.
