= Mutaro Kunda Forest Park =

Forest park in The Gambia

- IUCN category IV (habitat/species management area)
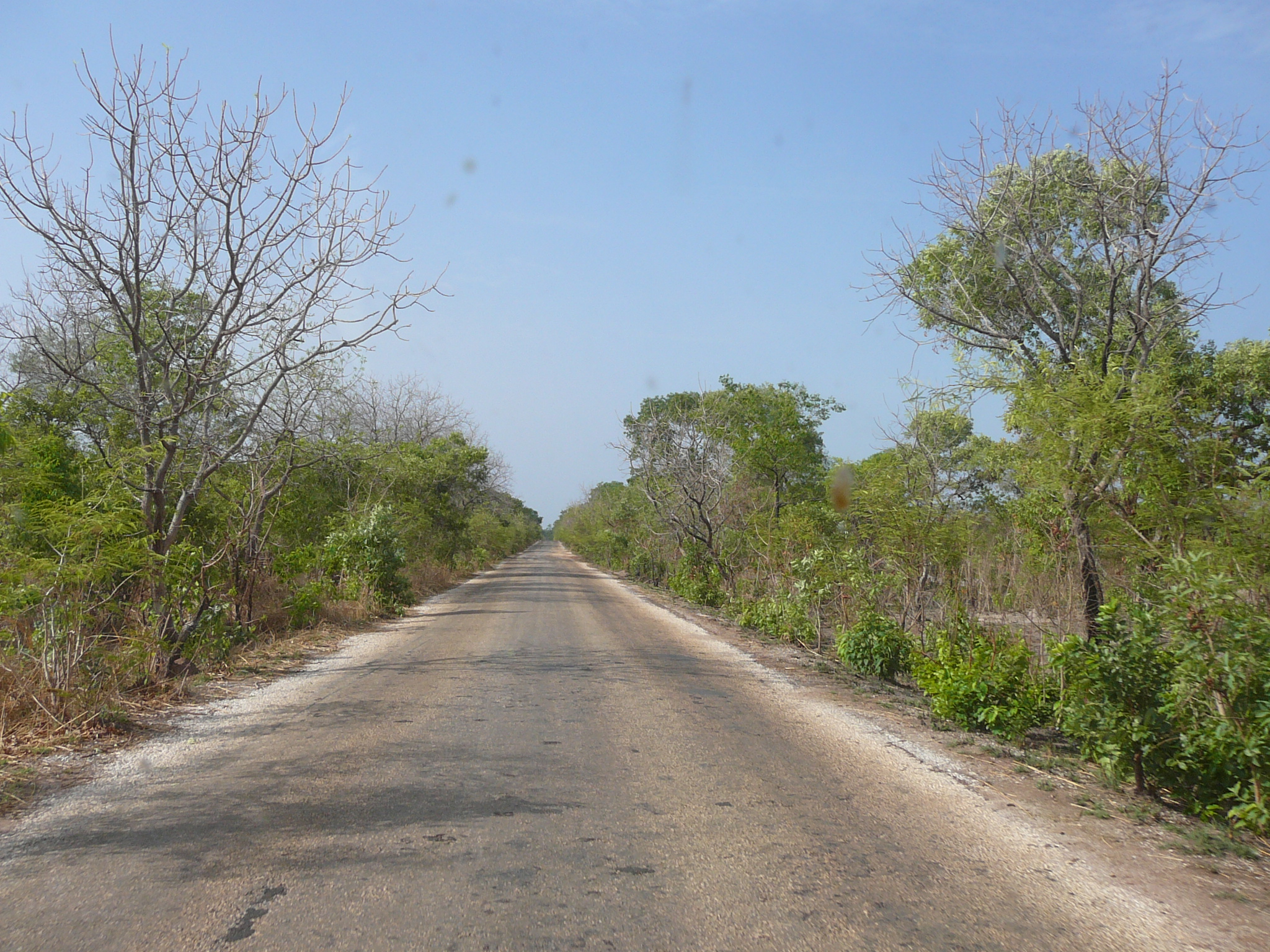
- Interactive map of Mutaro Kunda Forest Park
- Location: Lower River Division Gambia
- Nearest city: Soma
- Coordinates: 13°21′22″N 15°48′31″W
- Area: 809 ha (2,000 acres)
- Established: January 1, 1954

Mutaro Kunda Forest Park is a forest park in the Gambia. Established on January 1, 1954, it covers 809 hectares.
