= Guinea–Senegal relations =

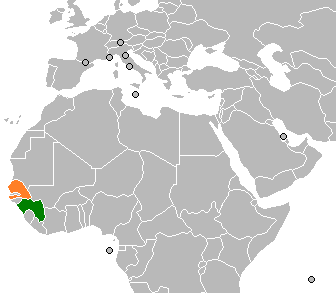
- Guinea: Senegal

Guinea–Senegal relations are foreign relations between the two neighbouring West African nations which are part of ECOWAS. Guinea and Senegal share a 363 km border and a long history of cooperation and occasional tension.

== History ==
Senegal closed its border with Guinea in 2014 and imposed controls for boats and ships on the Atlantic Ocean. The closure happened during the Western African Ebola epidemic. The border was reopened after one month period.

In 2021 two countries concluded an military cooperation agreement initially signed in 2020. In summer of 2024 President of Senegal Bassirou Diomaye Faye together with government representatives visited capital of Guinea Conakry where he met President of Guinea Mamady Doumbouya.

== Economic cooperation ==
In 2023 total trade between the two countries was $164.25 million. Senegal's exports to Guinea included non-fillet frozen fish, malt extract and other products.

== See also ==
- Sambangalou Hydroelectric Power Station
