= Jambur Solar Power Station =

Solar power station in the Gambia

Jambur Power Station
- Country: Gambia
- Location: Jambur, Kombo North District, West Coast Division
- Coordinates: 13°18′23″N 16°41′26″W
- Status: Operational
- Construction began: 4 February 2023
- Commission date: 25 March 2024
- Construction cost: US$28.4 million
- Owner: Government of the Gambia

Solar farm
- Type: Flat-panel PV
- Site area: 31.1 hectares (77 acres) + 8MWh Bess

Power generation
- Nameplate capacity: 23 MW (31,000 hp)

The Jambur Solar Power Station (JSPS), is an operational 23 MW (31,000 hp) solar power plant in Gambia. The power station began commercial operations in March 2024. It is owned and was developed by the government of Gambia, with funding from the European Union, the European Investment Bank and the World Bank. The power generated here is integrated into the Gambian national electricity grid, through the National Water and Electricity Company network.

== Location ==
The power station is located in the community called "Jambur", in Kombo South District, in the Brikama Local Government Area, southwest of Banjul, the capital city of the country and south of the Gambia River. Jambur Solar Power Station sits on approximately 31.1 hectares (77 acres) of land, about 37.5 kilometres (23 mi), southwest of the city of Banjul.

== Overview ==
Jambur Solar Power Station, is a component of the "Gambia Electricity Restoration and Modernization Project" (GERMP), a US$165 million infrastructure project financed by the European Investment Bank (EIB), the European Union (EU) and the World Bank (WB). The GERMP comprises the erection of the 23 MW JSPS, the construction and connection of an 8MWh battery energy storage system (BESS), the improvement of transmission and distribution electricity network in the country and the improvement of electricity connections to schools and health facilities. The project is expected to create 1,250 direct jobs during the construction, operation and maintenance phases.

== Developers ==
The power station was developed by the Gambian Ministry of Petroleum and Energy and The National Water and Electricity Company (NAWEC), with funding from the EIB, EU and the WB.

== Construction costs, funding, and commissioning ==
The engineering, procurement and construction (EPC) contract was awarded to Tebian Electric Apparatus (TBEA), a Chinese engineering and construction company. TBEA was also awarded a three-year operations and maintenance (O&M) contract. The table below illustrates the sources of funding for the (GERMP) infrastructure project.

Funding of Gambia Electricity Restoration and Modernization Project (GERMP)
Rank	Development Partner	Contribution in Euros	US$ Equivalent	Percentage	Notes
1	European Union	40.0 million	43.2 million	26.18	Loan
2	European Investment Bank	65.0 million	70.2 million	42.55	Loan
3	World Bank	36.0 million	38.9 million	23.58	Loan
4	Government of Gambia	11.8 million	12.7 million	7.70	Equity
	Total	152.8 million	165.0 million	100.00	

- Note: Totals may be slightly off due to rounding.

Construction began in February 2023. Commercial commissioning was achieved in March 2024.

== See also ==
- Soma Solar Power Station
