= Bijol Islands =

Island group

Coordinates: 13°23′05″N 16°49′02″W

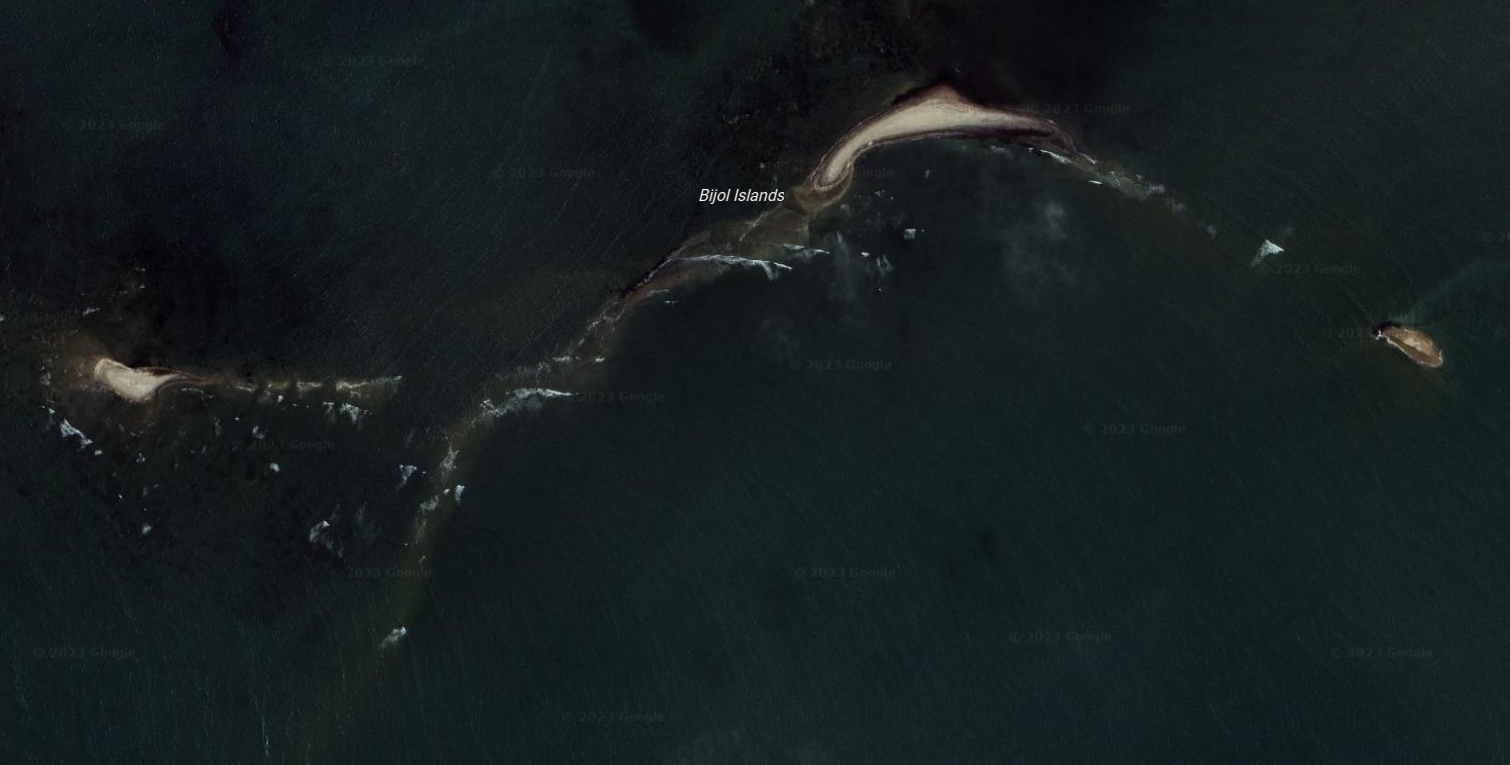
The Bijol Islands seen from a satellite view.

The Bijol Islands are a group of islets located off the coast of The Gambia.

== Geography ==
The small uninhabited island group of the Bijol Islands is in the Atlantic Ocean. The five-islet group lies about two and a half to three and a half kilometers off the coast at Bald Cape north of the village of Tanji in the district of Kombo South. They form the westernmost territory of The Gambia. The total area of the Bijol Islands is 0.1 square kilometers.

They are the only non river/river delta islands The Gambia has.

== Area ==
The area of the biggest Bijol Island is roughly 8,522 meters squared.

== Population ==
The Bijol Islands are uninhabited.
