= Kombo South =

District of the Gambia

Coordinates: 13°15′N 16°45′W

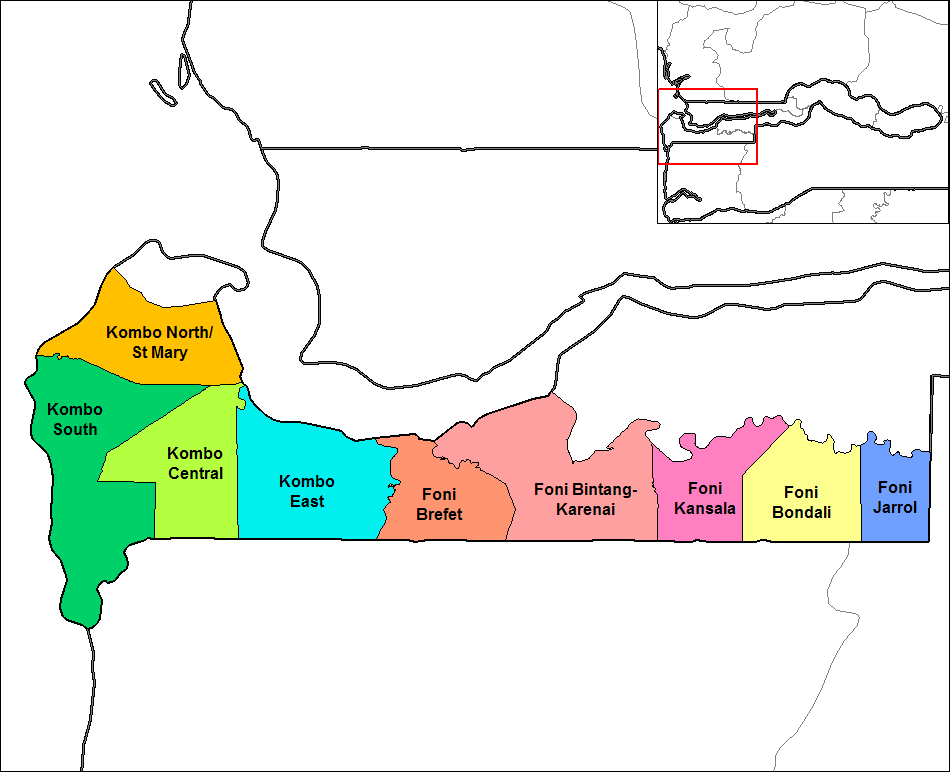
Districts of the Western Division. Kombo South is in dark green.

Kombo South is one of the nine districts of the Gambia's Western Division, which is located to the south of the Gambia River in the southwest of the country. Kombo South is in the southwest of the division, between Kombo Central and Kombo North/Saint Mary. In the 2013 census, it had a population of 108,773.

Places in Kombo South include Gunjur, Sanyang, Jambanjelly, Jambur, Tujereng, Tanji, Kartong, Sifoe and Farato.

The district includes the southern Atlantic coast of the Gambia and the country's southernmost point.
