= Foni Kansala =

District of the Gambia

Coordinates: 13°13′N 16°03′W

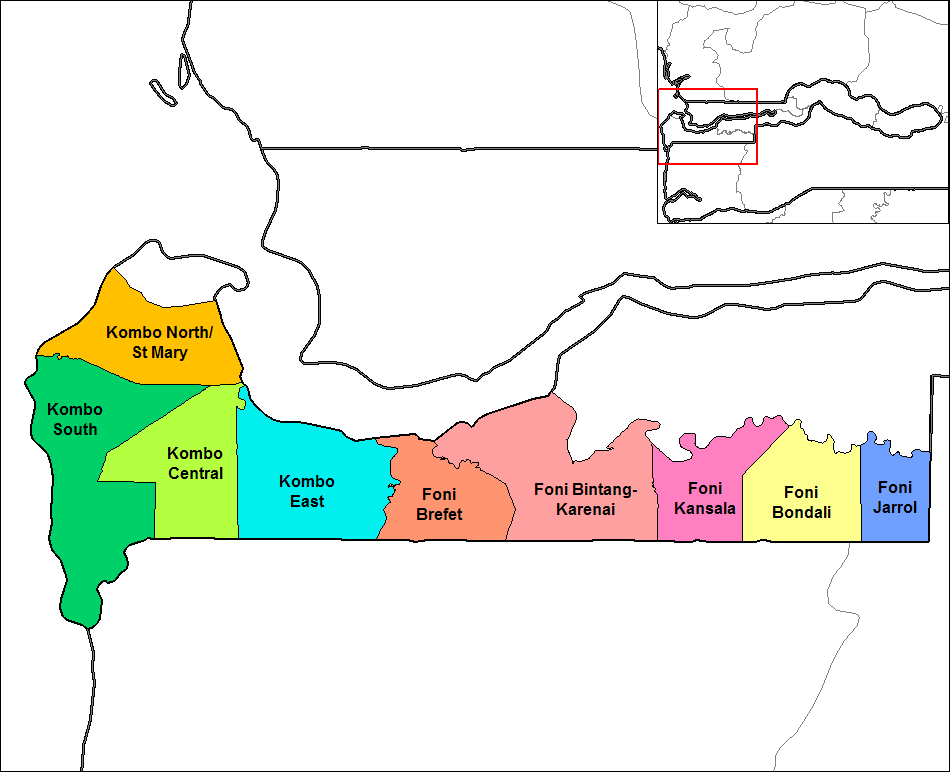
Districts of the Western Division. Foni Kansala is in pink.

Foni Kansala is one of the nine districts of the Gambia's West Coast Region, which is located to the south of the Gambia River in the southwest of the country. Foni Kansala is in the southeast of the division, between Foni Bintang-Karenai and Foni Bondali.
