= Faraba shooting =

- Location: Faraba Banta, The Gambia
- Date: 18 June 2018
- Deaths: 3
- Injuries: 10
- Victim: 3 protestors
- Perpetrator: Gambian police officers
- Inquiry: Commission of enquiry led by Emmanuel Joof

The Faraba shooting was an incident in the town of Faraba Banta, The Gambia, that took place on 18 June 2018. During a protest against mining operations, officers of the Gambia Police Force used live ammunition, firing on protesters. Two were killed instantly, with a third dying two days later. A number of other protestors and police officers were injured during the confrontation.

== Background ==
In 2018 in the town of Faraba Banta, 50 km south of Banjul, a contract was awarded to the Julakey Company to conduct sand mining operations in the area. Accusations were leveled that the contract had been awarded without consulting the local village council and stakeholders in the project. The week prior to the shooting, the National Assembly's Committee on the Environment had ordered the Julakey Company to cease operations pending the outcome of an investigation into their operations. However, due to complications in communications, by the day of the incident the company had yet to receive an official letter from the committee asking them to do so.

== Incident ==
On 18 June 2018, a number of angry local residents took to the streets of Faraba Banta to protest the mining company. Parts of the protest turned violent, and five trucks that were loading sand in the mining area were set on fire by Faraba youths. Youths were also seen targeting compounds belonging to Bo Jarju, Ba Jambang Sanyang, Bakary Saidy, and Nuha Kujabi, among others, who had all been involved in the mining operations. Their house materials were removed and set on fire.

A detachment of the Gambia Police Force's Police Intervention Unit (PIU) was dispatched to deal with the protest. The protesters clashed, and a number of PIU officers sustained injuries. These were later named as Modou Dem, Alie Camara, and Momodou Jallow. Camara was identified as the PIU officer who fired live ammunition at the protesters. Bakary Kujabi and Ismalie Bah were killed instantly. Amadou Nyang-Jawo, a student at The Gambia College, was hospitalised at the Edward Francis Small Teaching Hospital in Banjul. Masanneh Njie, Salaman Darboe, Jalaman Darboe, Pa Jammeh, Sainey Sonko, Sheriffo Touray, Dawda Daffeh, Buba Sanyang, and Francis Jambang were all injured in the clash and taken to Brikama Major Hospital.

Nyang-Jawo died in hospital on 20 June, having previously been in a critical state.

== Responses ==
=== Activists and human rights organisations ===
Mustapha Camara, a youth leader from Faraba and eyewitness to the incident, tearfully condemned the killing of unarmed youths by the PIU. He called on the government to launch an immediate investigation. Two international human rights organisations, the Institute for Human Rights and Development in Africa (IHRDA), and Article 19, called on the government to investigate the shooting via an independent investigation.

=== Police ===
Following the incident, Landing Kinteh, the Inspector General of Police, denied giving police officers the authority to use live ammunition during the incident. He released a statement saying that his office "will investigate the circumstances that led to this unfortunate incident." On 21 June, Kinteh resigned from his role as Inspector General, under pressure to allow through an independent investigation. His deputy, Alahagie Mamour Jobe, took over the role in an acting capacity.

=== Government ===
The day after the incident, the office of President Adama Barrow released a statement saying that he was "deeply saddened" by the reports. He had ordered a thorough investigation into the matter as soon as possible. He called for "calm and restraint" and also issued a directive for all mining activities to be suspended until further notice. In the week following the incident, Barrow appointed a presidential commission of enquiry, appointed a coroner, and visited victims in the Edward Francis Small Teaching Hospital. On 22 June, Barrow visited the town of Faraba. He led the Friday prayer before speaking, saying "It is not only Faraba Banta that is in mourning, but the entire country is in shock and mourning."

== Investigation ==
Five police officers involved in the shooting, including two superintendents, were taken into custody by the police. On 21 June, it was announced that Barrow had appointed a commission of enquiry into the incident, to be chaired by human rights lawyer Emmanuel Joof. The commission would have five other members, consisting of a representative from the Ministry of Justice, the Gambia Bar Association, the Gambia Armed Forces, the State Intelligence Services, and The Association of Non-Governmental Organisations (TANGO). On 6 July, the members of the commission were sworn in by President Barrow, and were as follows:

- Emmanuel Joof, chairman, human rights lawyer
- Neneh M. C. Cham, barrister, solicitor, and president of the Female Lawyers Association of The Gambia (FLAG)
- Abdoulie Colley, state counsel
- Omar Cham, former NIA officer
- Yusupha Jallow, lieutenant in the military police
- Charles Njie, secretary, chairman of TANGO
