= Brikama Power Station =

Fuel-fired power plant in Brikama, The Gambia

- Country: The Gambia
- Location: Brikama
- Coordinates: 13°17′38.4″N 16°38′06.2″W
- Status: Operational
- Commission date: August 2006
- Construction cost: EUR 15 million

Thermal power station
- Primary fuel: Diesel fuel

Power generation
- Units operational: 4
- Nameplate capacity: 25 MW

The Brikama Power Station is a fossil fuel power station in Brikama, The Gambia.

== History ==
The power station was inaugurated in August 2006 by President Yahya Jammeh.

== Finance ==
The power station was constructed with a cost of EUR15 million.

== Technical specifications ==
The power station has an installed capacity of 25 MW. It consists of four 6.38 MW generators.

== See also ==
- Economy of the Gambia
