= Kiang East =

Coordinates: 13°25′N 15°38′W

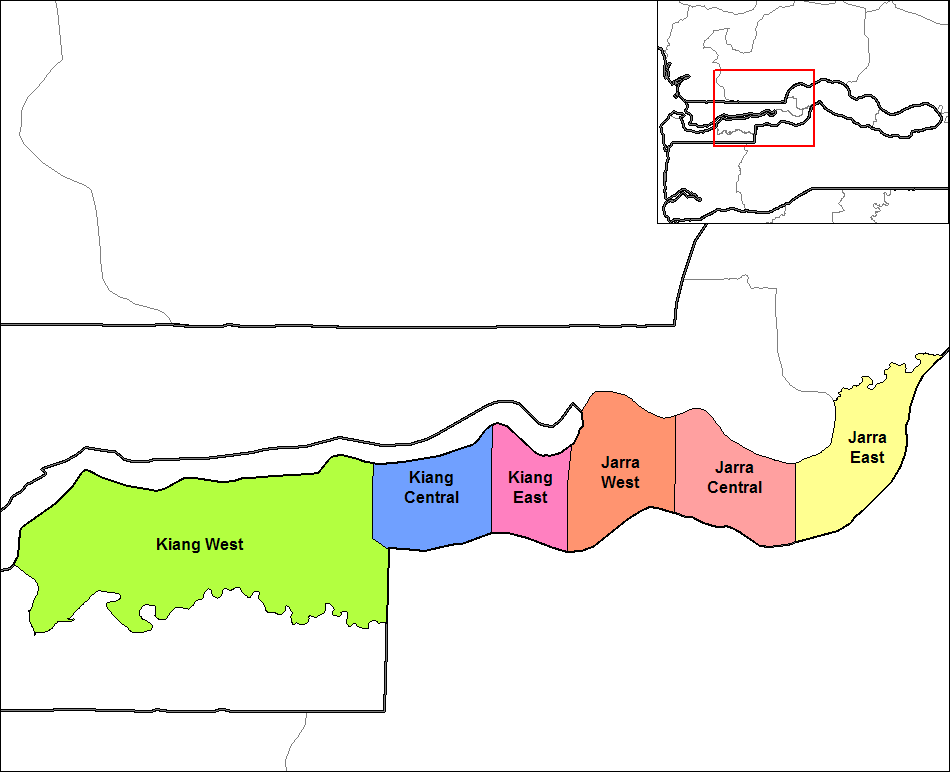
Districts of Lower River Division

Kiang East is one of the six districts of the Lower River Division of the Gambia. Along with Kiang Central and Kiang West, it makes up the Kiang area. In the 2013 census, it had a population of 6,849.
