= Kiang West =

Coordinates: 13°20′N 16°00′W

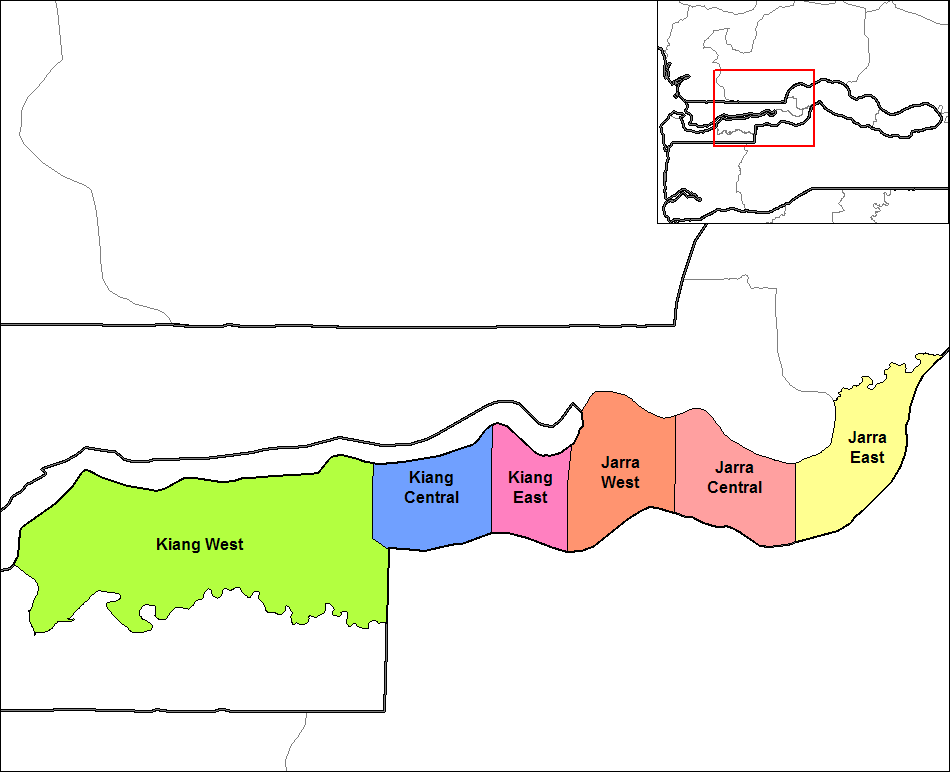
Districts of Lower River Division

Kiang West is one of the six districts of the Lower River Division of the Gambia. Along with Kiang Central and Kiang East, it makes up the Kiang area. In the 2013 census, it had a population of 14,953.
