= Assane Seck =

Senegalese politician

Assane Seck, 1976

Assane Seck (1 February 1919 – 27 November 2012) was a Senegalese politician from Fogny. He served as Foreign Minister of Senegal from 1973–1978. He was said to be "forced into political retirement".

== Works ==
- La Moyenne Casamance. Étude de géographie physique, 1955
- (in collaboration with Alfred Mondjannagni), L'Afrique occidentale, 1967
- Les grandes villes d'Afrique et de Madagascar : Dakar, 1968
- Dakar, métropole ouest-africaine, 1970 (thèse)
- Sénégal, émergence d'une démocratie moderne, (1945-2005) : un itinéraire politique (préface de Djibril Samb), 2005

== Bibliography ==
- Assane Seck, Sénégal. Émergence d’une démocratie moderne (1945-2005). Un itinéraire politique, Karthala, Paris, 2005
- Momar Coumba Diop et Mamadou Diouf, Le Sénégal sous Abdou Diouf, Paris, Karthala, 1990
