= Kombo Central =

District of the Gambia

Coordinates: 13°15′N 16°40′W

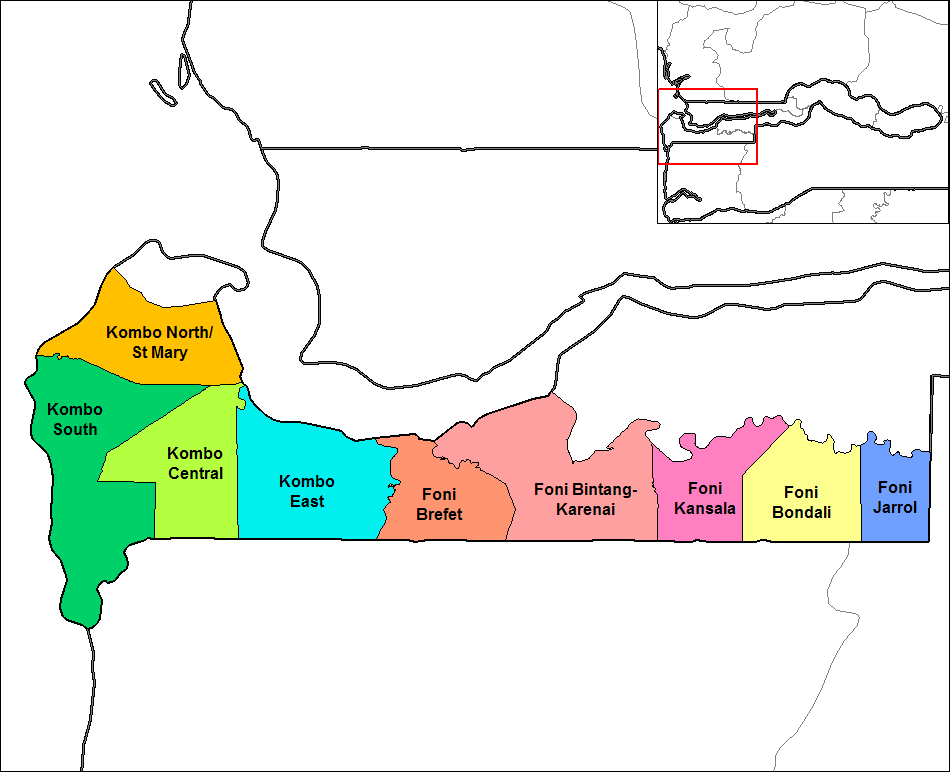
Districts of the Western Division. Kombo Central is in light green.

Kombo Central is one of the nine districts of the Gambia's Western Division, which is located to the south of the Gambia River in the southwest of the country. Kombo Central is in the southwest of the division, between Kombo East and Kombo South. In the 2013 census, it had a population of 142,831.
