= Foni Brefet =

District of the Gambia

Coordinates: 13°13′N 16°20′W

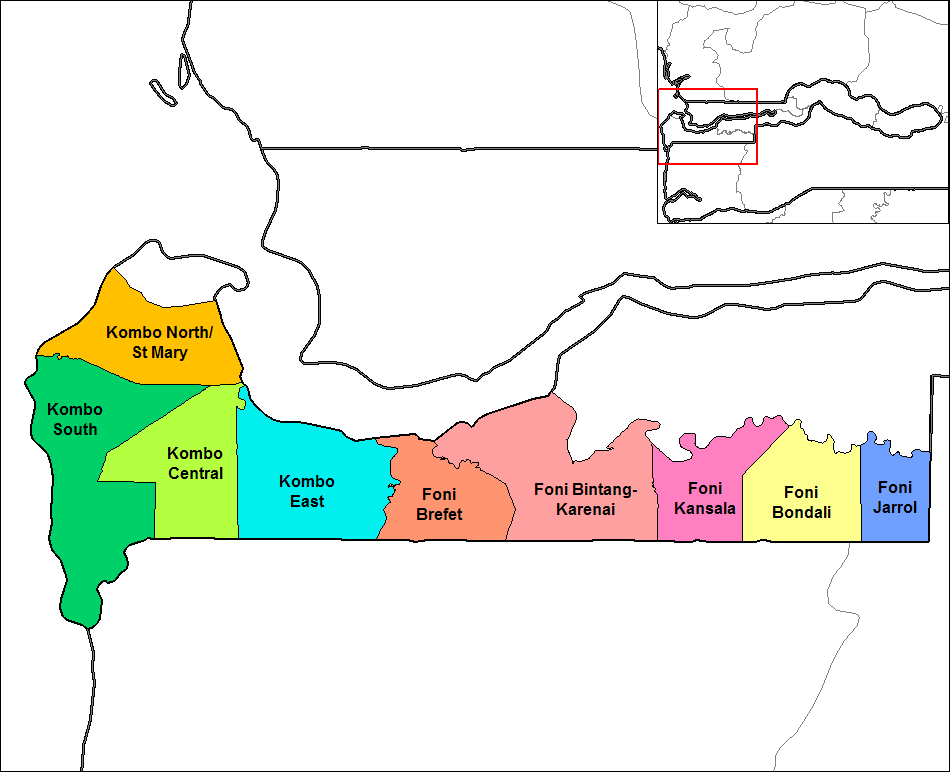
Districts of the Western Division; Foni Brefet is in light red

Foni Brefet is one of the nine districts of the Gambia's Western Division, which is located to the south of the Gambia River in the southwest of the country. Foni Brefet is in the center of the division, between Kombo East and Foni Bintang-Karenai.
