= Kombo East =

Coordinates: 13°13′N 16°31′W

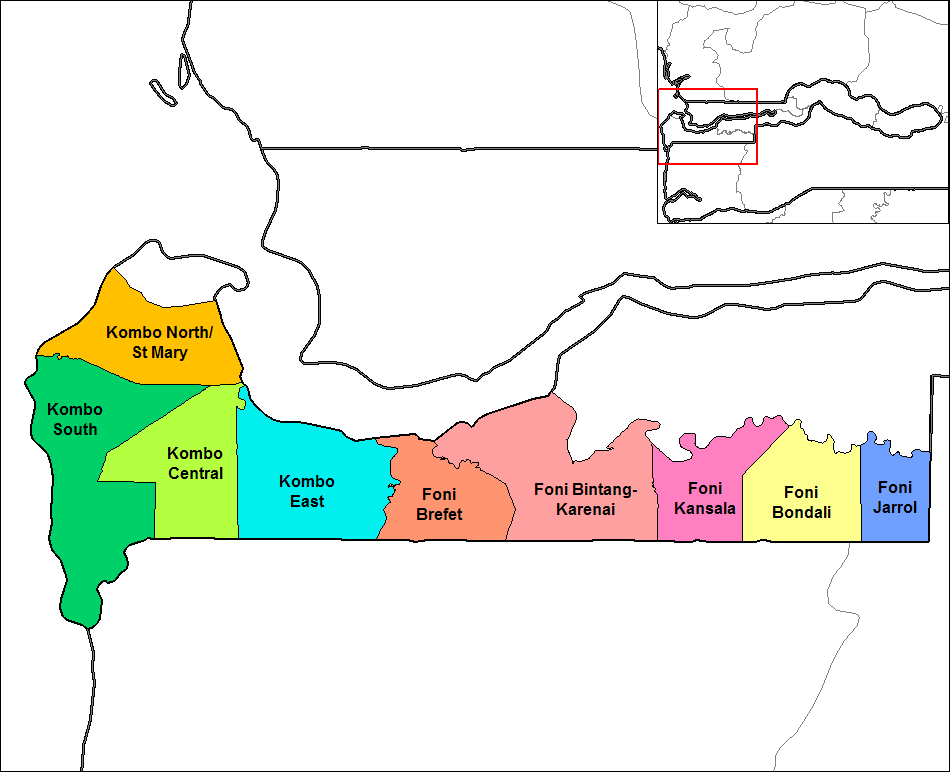
Districts of the Western Division. Kombo East is in light blue.

Kombo East is one of the nine districts of the Gambia's Western Division, which is located to the south of the Gambia River in the southwest of the country. Kombo East is in the central south of the division, between Kombo Central and Foni Brefet.

In June 2022, the clean-up of River Gambia from the oil spill from the MT FT Sturla began in the Kombo East district.
