= Foni Bintang-Karenai =

District of the Gambia

Coordinates: 13°15′N 16°13′W

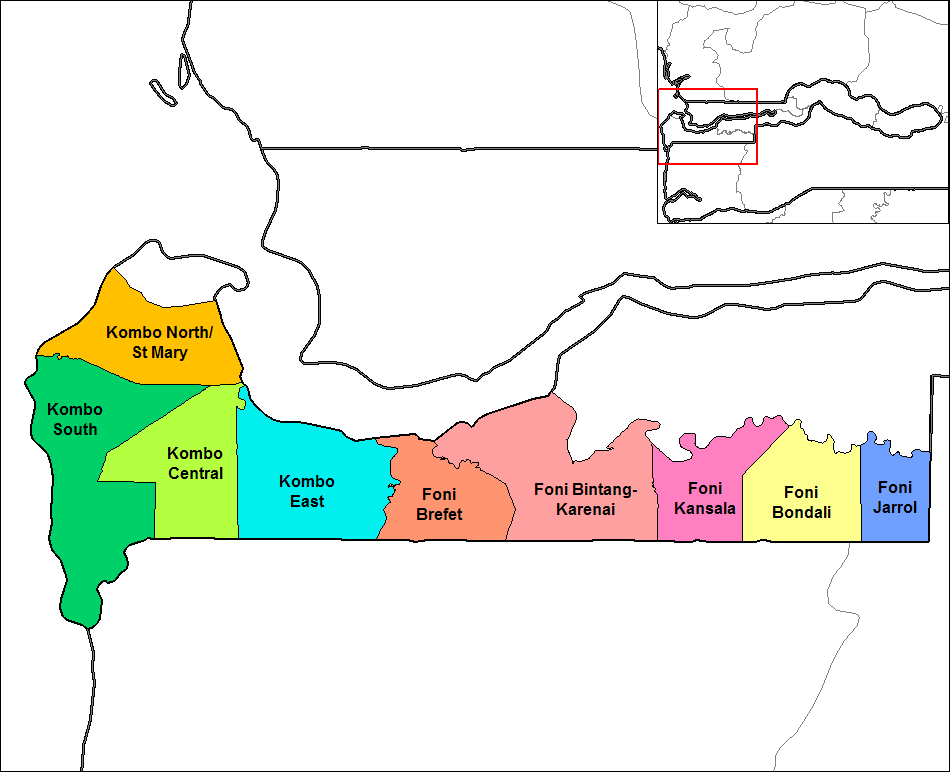
Districts of the Western Division. Foni Bintang-Karenai is in light pink.

Foni Bintang-Karenai is one of the nine districts of the Gambia's Western Division, which is located to the south of the Gambia River in the southwest of the country. Foni Bintang-Karenai is in the central south of the division, between Foni Kansala and Foni Brefet.
