= Foni Bondali =

District of the Gambia

Coordinates: 13°13′N 15°56′W

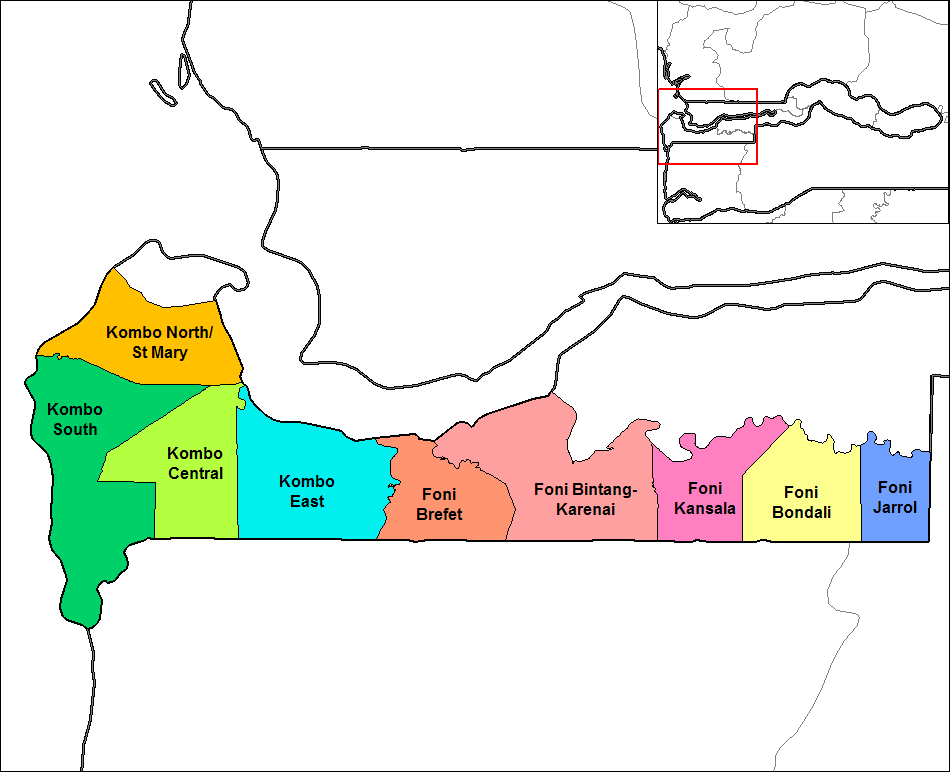
Districts of the Western Division. Foni Bondali is in light yellow.

Foni Bondali is one of the nine districts of the Gambia's Western Division, which is located to the south of the Gambia River in the southwest of the country. Foni Bondali is in the southeast of the division, between Foni Kansala and Foni Jarrol.
