= Foni Jarrol =

District of the Gambia

Coordinates: 13°14′N 15°50′W

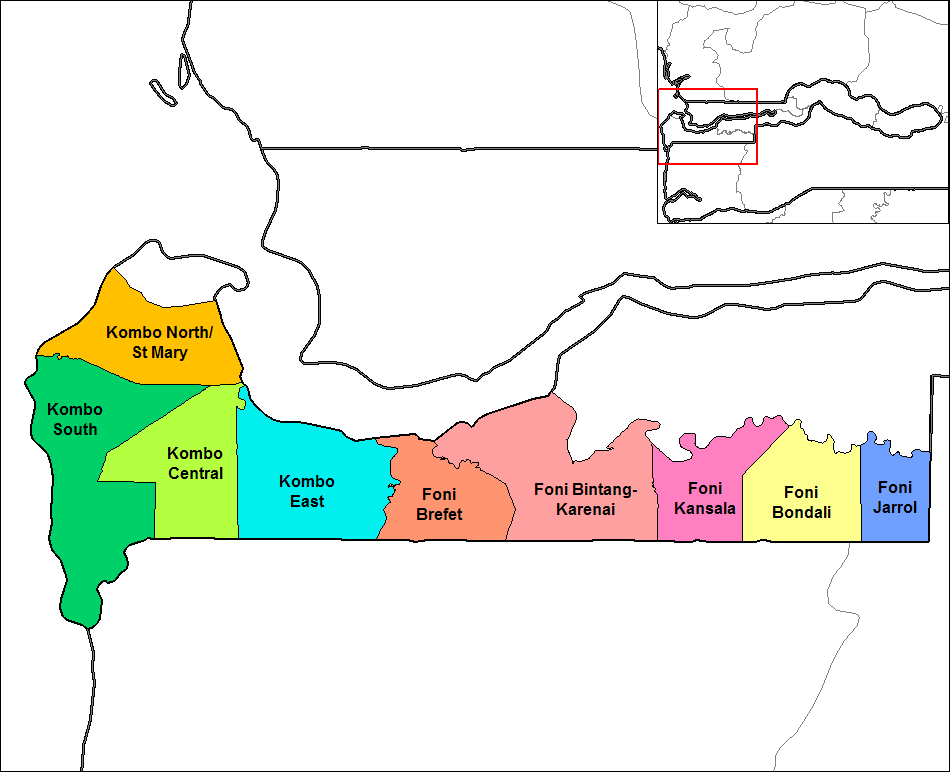
Districts of the Western Division. Foni Jarrol is in dark blue.

Foni Jarrol is one of the nine districts of the Gambia's Western Division, which is located to the south of the Gambia River in the southwest of the country. Foni Jarrol is in the far east of the division, between Foni Bondali and the border with Senegal.
