= Sambangalou Hydroelectric Power Station =

Hydropower station in Senegal

- Map of Senegal showing the location of Sambangalou Hydroelectric Power Station Sambangalou Hydroelectric Power Station (Africa) Sambangalou Hydroelectric Power Station (Earth)
- Country: Senegal
- Location: Sambangalou, Kédougou Region
- Coordinates: 12°23′57″N 12°11′48″W
- Purpose: Power
- Status: Proposed
- Construction began: 2021 (Expected)
- Opening date: 2025 (Expected)
- Construction cost: €388 million
- Owner: Organisation for the Development of the Gambia River
- Operator: Organisation for the Development of the Gambia River

Dam and spillways
- Impounds: Gambia River

Power Station
- Commission date: 2025 (expected)
- Annual generation: 402 GWh

Sambangalou Hydroelectric Power Station is a hydropower plant under construction in Senegal, with planned capacity installation of 128 megawatts (172,000 hp) when completed.

== Location ==
The power station is located on Gambia River, in Kédougou Region, in southeastern Senegal, close to the border with Guinea. Its location is approximately 25 kilometres (16 mi), south of Kédougou, the regional capital. This is in excess of 700 kilometres (435 mi), southeast of Dakar, the capital city of Senegal. The approximate coordinates of Sambangalou Hydroelectric Power Station are: 12°23'57.0"N, 12°11'48.0"W (Latitude:12.399167; Longitude:-12.196667).

== Overview ==
This power station is a component of a multi-purpose project aimed at (a) providing electricity to the four countries of the Organisation for the Development of the Gambia River (OMVG), namely; Senegal, Guinea-Bissau, Guinea and the Gambia, (b) supplying irrigation water to the farming communities in the region and (c) providing a source of drinking water to the residents of the area.

The OMVG, which owns and is developing the tiered project and power station, selected a consortium of French and Austrian companies to execute the developments. The project will be developed in phases: Phase I involves the building of access roads, construction of staff houses for the construction crews and the erection of Kédougou Bridge. Phase 2 involves the construction of the 91 metres (299 ft) tall dam and the power station, creating a reservoir with a surface area of 181 square kilometres (70 mi^{2}), extending from Senegal to Guinea. Phase III involves the installation of the electro-mechanical equipment into the power station, capable of generating 128 megawatts of electricity.

Construction on the project started in January 2023.

== Developers ==
The table below illustrates the composition of the consortium that was selected to develop the power station and related infrastructure, at a contract price of €388 million.

Developers of Sambangalou Hydroelectric Power Station
Rank	Name of Developer	Domicile	Percentage Ownership
1	Vinci Construction Grands Projects	France	37.5
2	Vinci Construction Terrassement	France	37.5
3	Andritz Hydro Germany	Germany	12.5
3	Andritz Hydro Austria	Austria	12.5
	Total		100.0

== Funding ==
The list of funders for this project include, but is not limited to, the following entities:

1. Government of Gambia
2. Government of Guinea-Bissau
3. Government of Guinea
4. Government of Senegal
5. The Organisation for the Development of the Gambia River (OMVG)
6. African Development Bank (ADB)
7. European Investment Bank (EIB)
8. French Development Agency (AFD)
9. Islamic Development Bank (IsDB)
10. Japanese International Cooperation Agency (JICA)
11. Kuwait Fund for Arab Economic Development (KFAED)
12. West African Development Bank (BOAD)
13. World Bank
14. Exim Bank of China

== Other considerations ==
Prior to the award of the construction contract in December 2020, Environmental and Social Impact Assessment (ESIA) studies were carried out and a Resettlement Action Plan (RAP) was developed during the preceding 18 months. An estimated 1,000 jobs are expected to be created locally, during the construction period.

The power generated at this power station will be evacuated via four 225kV high voltage power lines to locations in each of the four beneficiary countries, where the energy will be integrated into each of the national electricity grids.

Construction is expected to commence during the first half of 2021, with commercial commissioning expected in 2025. After the project has been concluded, the water treatment and distribution system, will be donated to the local community.

== See also ==
- Senegal Power Stations
- Africa Power Dams
- World Power Dams
