= The Gambia College =

Coordinates: 13.2856°N 16.6572°W

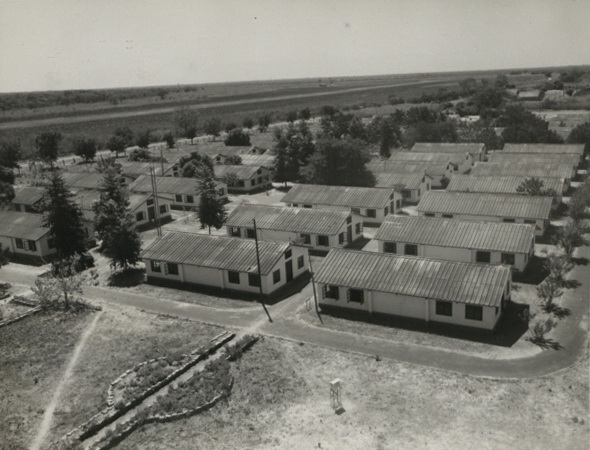
The Yundum College (1959)

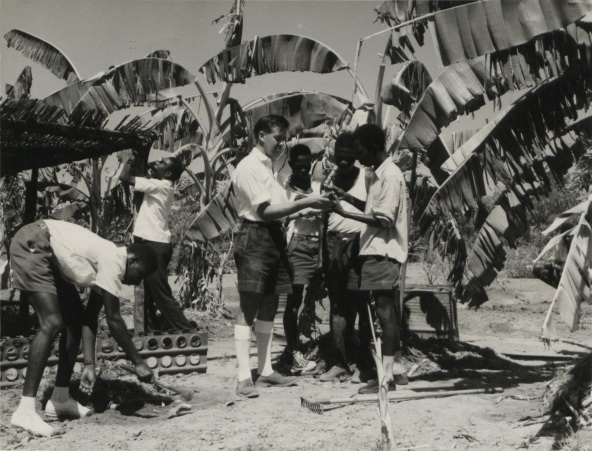
Students of the Yundum College (1959)

The Gambia College is a Gambian tertiary institution with campuses located in Banjul and Brikama. Its origins lie in the Yundum Teachers Training College, which was founded in 1952 (73 years ago) and became the Yundum College in 1955 (70 years ago), and the Gambia School of Nursing and Midwifery, the School of Agriculture and the School of Public Health.

In 1978 (47 years ago), those hitherto separated institutions were merged by an Act of Parliament and The Gambia College was established. The new college opened in 1980 with two campuses: the School of Nursing and Midwifery is based in Banjul, whereas the Schools of Agriculture, Education, and Public Health are located in Brikama. It closed in March 1981 due to major disturbances by students but reopened in October 1982. After the Gambia College Act was passed in 1989 which required the college to provide further education, it expanded in the 1990s.

== Campuses ==
The Brikama campus is the headquarters of the Gambia College; it is located in Brikama, West Coast Region.

It houses the schools of Education, Agriculture, and Public Health. The other campus is the Banjul campus, it houses the school of nursing and midwifery.

== Leadership ==
Mr Aboubacarr Jallow a Gambian is the 19th Principal of The Gambia College from 2015 to present.

Former heads of the College and their nationalities:

- Prof Muhammed Kah, 2010 to 2014, Gambian
- Dr. A. B. Senghore, 2004 to 2009, Gambian
- Jenung Manneh, 1991 to 2004, Gambian
- N. S. Z. Njie, 1984 to 1991, Gambian
- S. M. Adu-Ampoma, 1982 to 1984, Ghanaian
- G. W. L. Thomas, 1978 to 1982, Gambian
- D. A. Nicholas, 1973 to 1978, British
- M. M. Jagne, 1971 to 197, British
- C. W. Cole, 1964 to 1967, Gambian
- P. Cavage, 1960 to 1964, British
- D. H. Blakely, 1959 to 1960, British
- G. S. Smith, 1958 to 1959, British
- J. S. Malone, 1955 to 1958, British
- G. Davies, 1954 to 1955, British
- G. O'Halloran, 1953 to 1954, British
- S. L Burk, 1950 to 1953, British
- D. W. Grieve, 1949 to 1950, British
