= Kombo North/Saint Mary =

Coordinates: 13°22′N 16°40′W

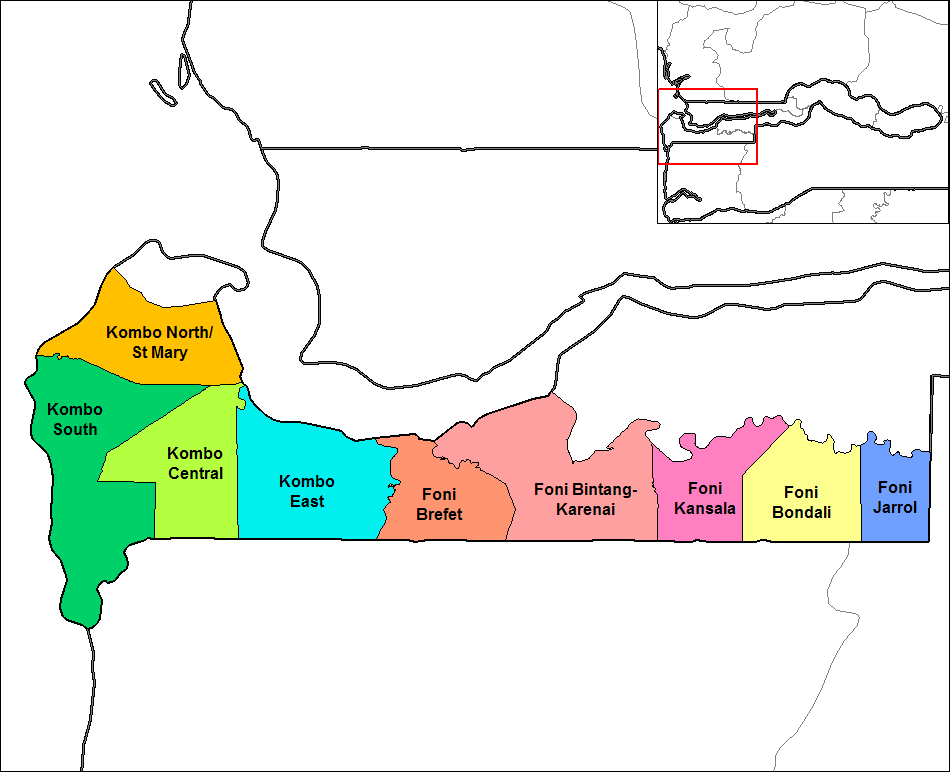
Districts of the Western Division. Kombo North/Saint Mary is in orange/amber at the west coast.

Kombo North/Saint Mary is one of the nine districts of the Gambia's Brikama Local Government Area (formerly known as the Western Division), which is located to the south of the Gambia River in the southwest of the country. Kombo North/Saint Mary is in the northwest of the LGA, between Kombo South and Kanifing LGA. It is the only district in the LGA with coasts on both the Atlantic Ocean and the Gambia River, and is the most populated district in the LGA, with 344,756 inhabitants at the 2013 Census.

Villages in the district include Amdalai.
