= Brikama =

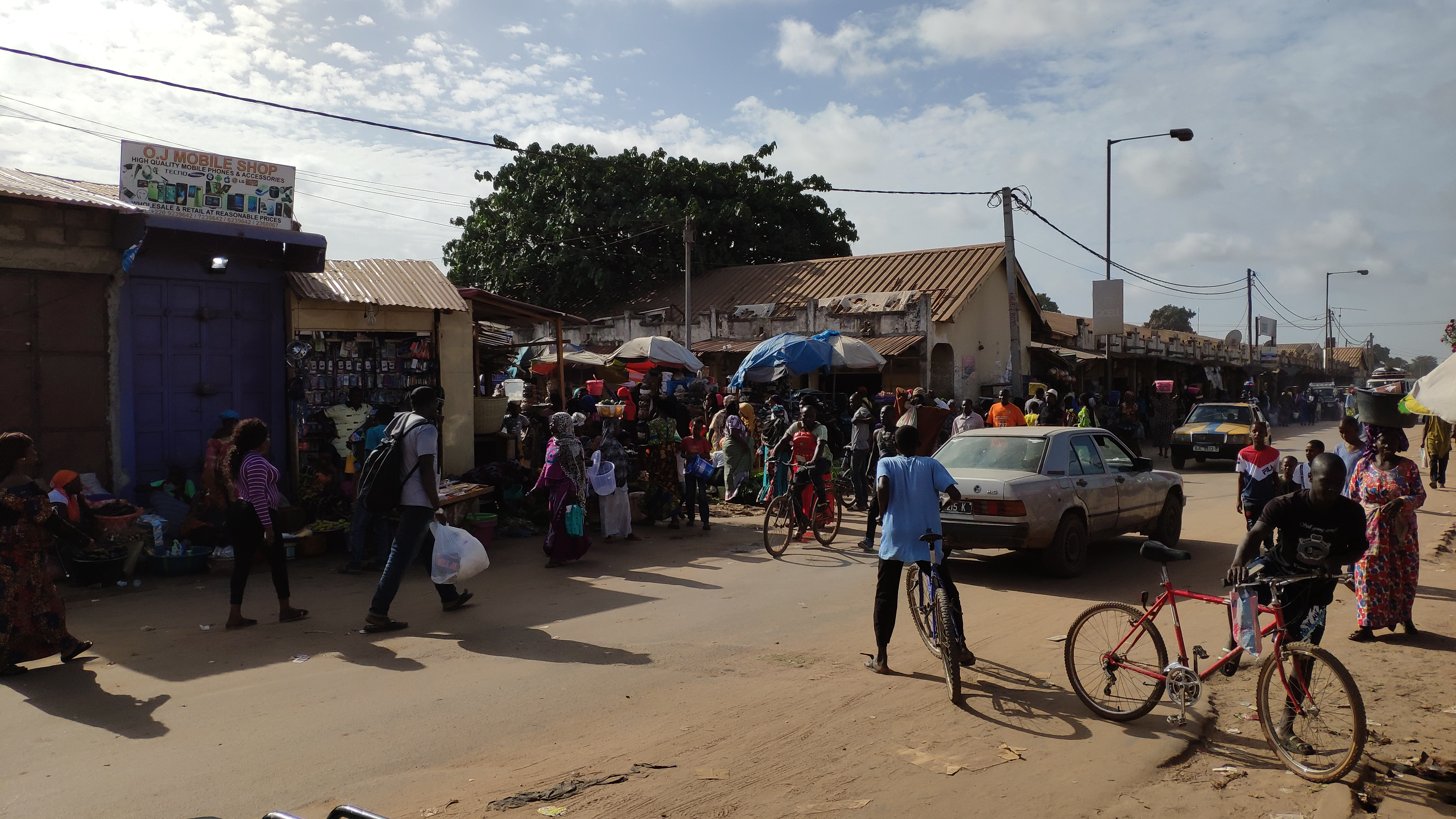
- Nyambai Road
- Nickname: Satey Ba

- Location in the Gambia
- Coordinates: 13°16′N 16°39′W
- Country: The Gambia
- Division: Brikama Local Government Area

Population (2021)
  - Total: 77,700
- Time zone: UTC+0 (GMT)

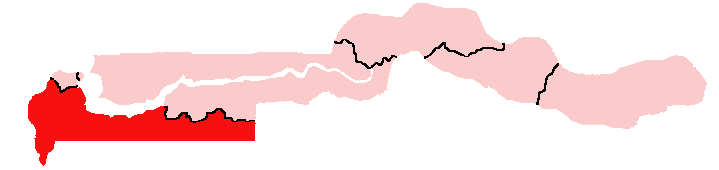
Location of the Brikama Local Government Area in the Gambia

Brikama is one of the largest cities in the Gambia. It is also called 'Satey Ba' by the locals, meaning "big town". It lies southwest of the country's capital, Banjul. Brikama is the headquarters of the Brikama Local Government Area (formerly the Western Division), and is the largest city in the region containing over twenty five wards with a population of over 100,000. As per the 2013 census, the population of Brikama LGA is 730,895.

== Economy ==
In August 2006, Brikama Power Station was inaugurated by then President Yahya Jammeh.

== Culture ==
Brikama is known for wood carving. It is the center of the Gambian music industry with many famous musicians coming from Brikama. Local attractions include the Makasutu Culture Forest, craft market.

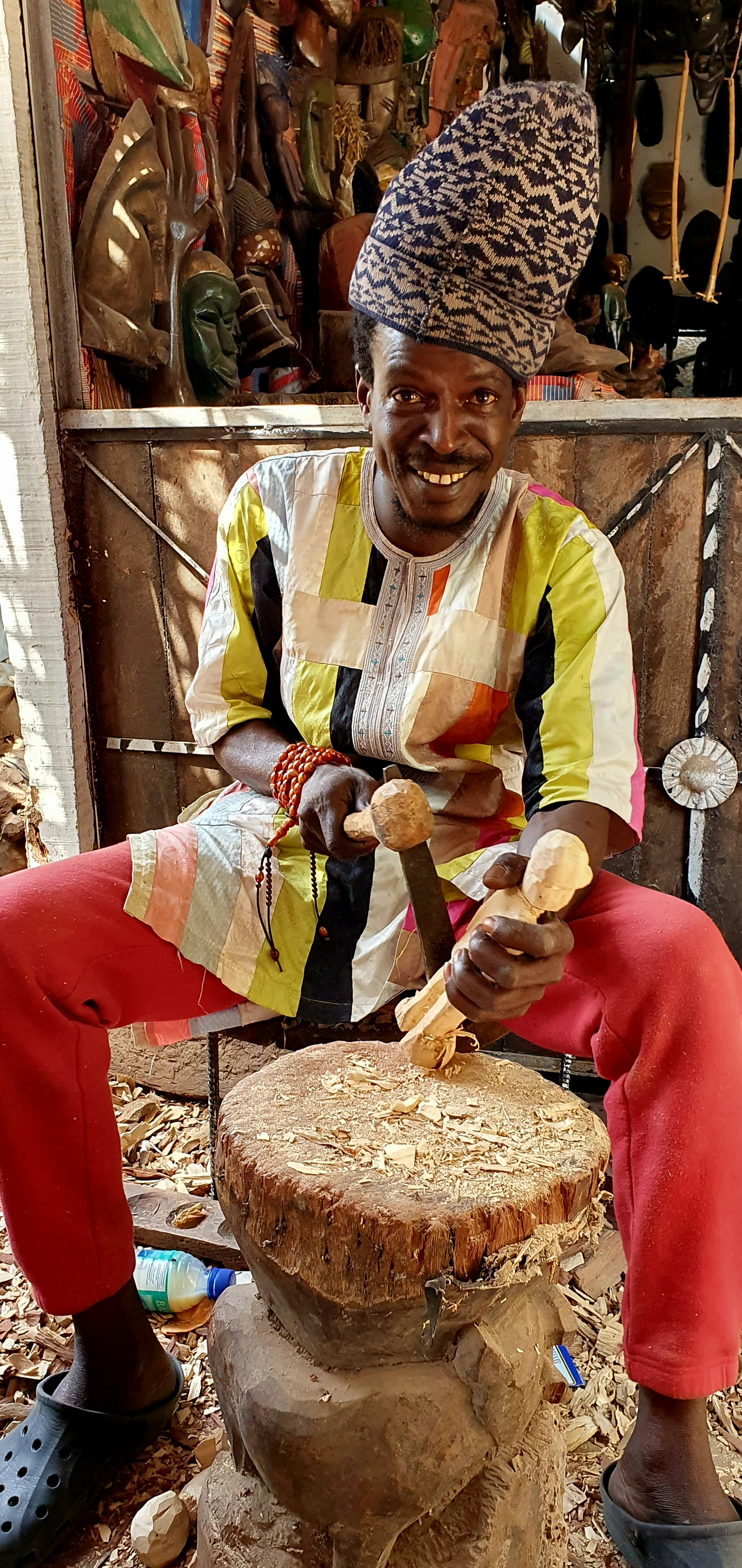
Wood Carver

== Education ==
Brikama is home to numerous educational institutions including The Gambia College, which trains the nation's teachers, and the Regional Education Office for the Western Region of the country. In addition, there are several secondary schools (Kinderdorf Bottrop, Kabafita junior and senior secondary, Kunte Kinte, St. Vincent, Maahad, and Methodist Academy), as well as a number of basic cycle schools and Islamic schools.

== Sports ==
Brikama has its own football club, Brikama United.
