= West Coast Region (The Gambia) =

Administrative division of the Gambia

Coordinates: 13°15′N 16°19′W

West Coast
- Division
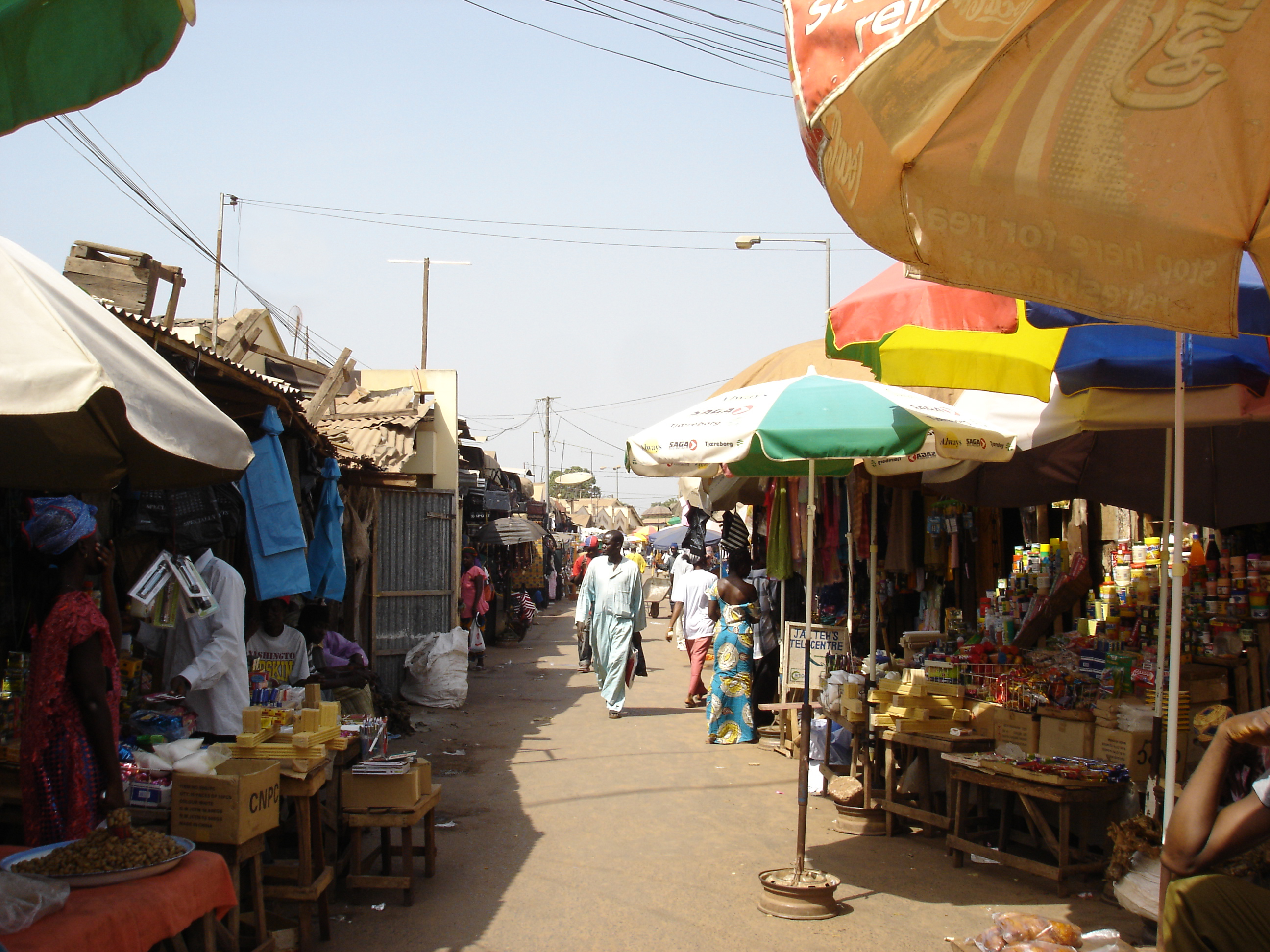
- Market in Brikama, 2006

- Location of West Coast Division in the Gambia
- Country: Gambia
- Capital: Brikama LGA

Area
  - Total: 1,764 km^{2} (681 sq mi)

Population (2013 census)
  - Total: 699,704
  - Density: 396.7/km^{2} (1,027/sq mi)
- Area code: (+220)

West Coast Region, originally the Western Division, also known as Foni or Fonyi, was one of the five administrative divisions of the Gambia. Its capital was Brikama. It was subsequently reorganised as the Brikama Local Government Area (LGA), without any change in the area covered.

Per 2013 census, the region had a population of 699,704 with a population density of 397. The total number of households was 45,396 as of 2003. As of 2003, the total area of the region is 1764.3 km^{2}. The infant mortality rate was 71 for every thousand births and the under-five mortality was 93 per every thousand births. The poverty gap ratio was 22.4 per cent and literacy rate was 69.7 per cent as of 2003.

== Geography ==
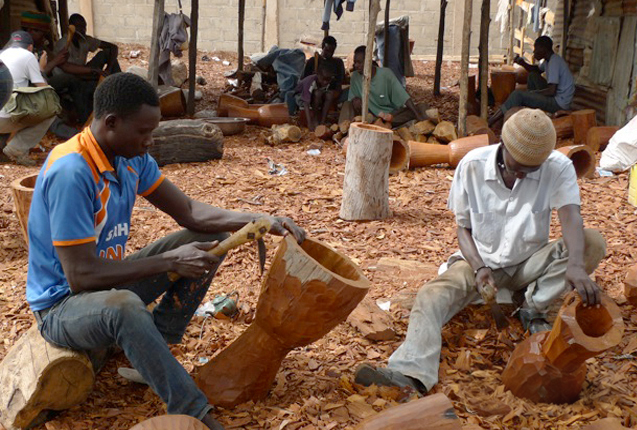
A market in the province

The Gambia is the smallest country in Africa and the width of the strip-like structure never exceeds 48 km (30 mi). It is bordered by the Atlantic Ocean to the west, and otherwise surrounded by Senegal. The Gambia River flows throughout the country and is the principal source of water and a transport route. The banks of the river have swampy beaches, while it has alluvial soil in all other parts, which is conducive for the growth of rice. Peanuts are the major cash crop. The weather is usually warm and dry. The elevation of the country reaches to a maximum of 50 m (160 ft) above the mean sea level. There are vast segments of sedimentary sandstone and claystone in the valleys of the rivers and the regions surrounding it. The river flows from Guinea and has an east–west axis. The shallow water in the coastline are important sources of fishing. They are mangrove and banto forests along the coastline. Over the river segment of 487 km (303 mi), there are numerous creeks, which are locally called boloons. The months from June to September experience a wet season, while the remaining seven months are dry. The average annual rainfall is around 1,400 mm (55 in) in the south east, while it is 720 mm (28 in) in the northwest. Experts have assessed that the overall rainfall during the century period between 1886 and 1992, there has been a reduction in rainfall of around 15-20 per cent and the wet season has been shortened.

== Demographics ==
Per 2013 census, the region had a population of 699,704 with a population density of 397. The total number of households was 45,396 as of 2003. As of 2003, the total area of the region is 1764.3 km^{2}. The infant mortality rate was 71 for every thousand births and the under-five mortality was 93 per every thousand births. The poverty gap ratio was 22.4 per cent as of 2003. The literacy rate of the province was 69.7 compared to a national average of 62.9 per cent. The net enrollment ratio in primary education was 70 per cent, children entering first grade of primary school reaching last grade of primary education was 99.5 per cent and the ratios of boys against girls in primary, secondary and tertiary education was 1.03 as of 2007.

== Local administration ==
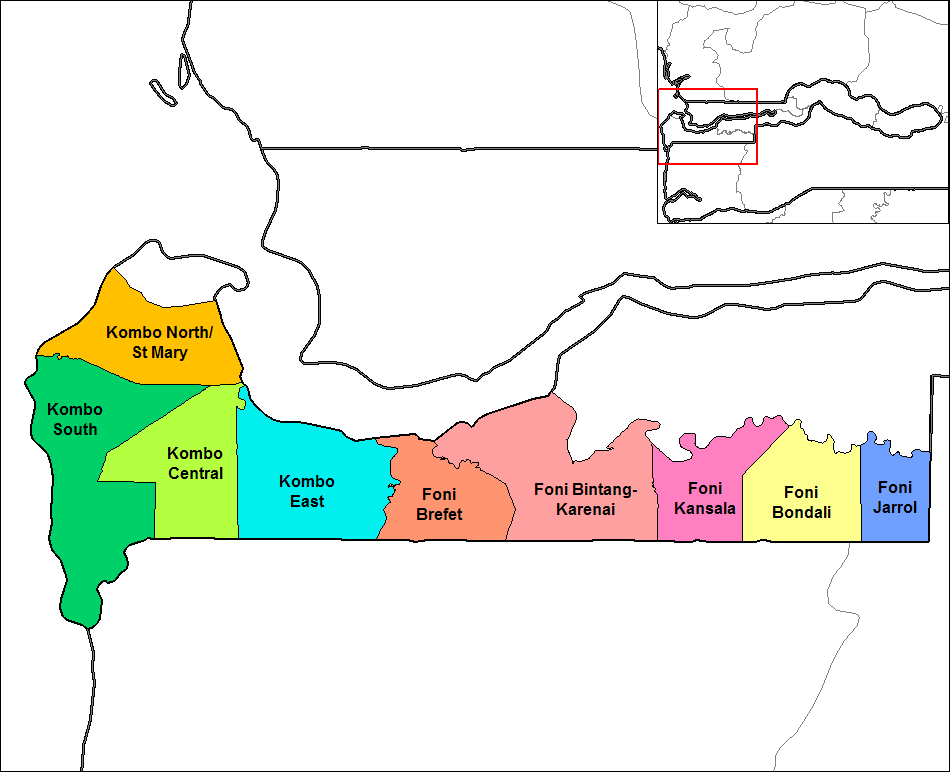
Districts of West Coast Region

The Gambia along with modern-day Senegal were colonies of Britain and France until 1894 when it became a British colony. Both Senegal and the Gambia acquired independence in 1960 and 1965 respectively, and operated in a confederation called Senegambia from 1982 until 1989, when the confederation collapsed. In a bloodless coup, Lieutenant Yahya Jamme took power in 1994 and went on to win multi party elections in three subsequent elections. He also defeated coups successfully and - unlike other West African countries - the Gambia had a relatively stable governance.

The Local Government passed in 2002 superseded the previous local government acts like Local Government Act (Amended 1984), Local Government (City of Banjul) Act (Amended 1988), The Kanifing Municipal Council Act 1991 and the Provinces Act. There were seven local governments defined each subdivided into districts and wards. The Mayor who is the chairperson of the council and the council members of each council is elected by people of the area. The legislations indicating the roles were not clearly defined, but the council is responsible for finance, services and planning for each sector under it. Around 25 per cent of the budget is funded by the central government. The council also has a Alkalo or Seyfo representative, the representative of the Chief, a youth nominee, a woman nominee and other nominated members of local interest groups.

West Coast Region, now the Brikama LGA, is divided into nine districts, namely, Foni Bintang-Karenai, Foni Bondali, Foni Brefet, Foni Jarrol, Foni Kansala, Kombo Central, Kombo East, Kombo North/Saint Mary and Kombo South. The city and area council elections were held during April 2002, when Ahmed Gibril Jassy, an APRC candidate became the Mayor, winning unopposed. The council was led by Alliance for Patriotic Reorientation and Construction (APRC), which won 22 out of the 24 seats, with the other two seats won by independents.

== See also ==
- Districts of the Gambia
