= Soma, Gambia =

Soma
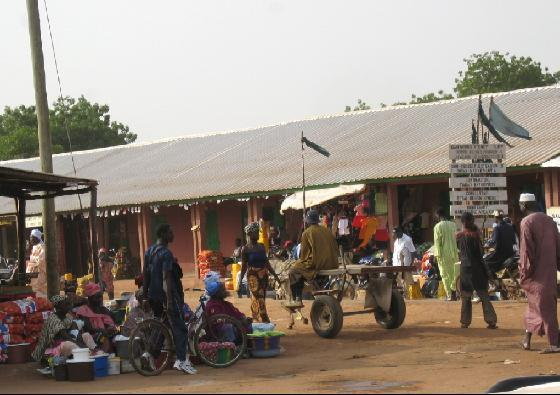

- Location in the Gambia
- Coordinates: 13°26′N 15°32′W
- Country: The Gambia
- Division: Lower River Division

Soma is a town in The Gambia, lying south of the River Gambia. It is an important crossroads, where the main east–west road in the country crosses the Trans-Gambia Highway and it also sits between Northern and Southern Senegal. A vibrant market town and an economic hub of the region, known for its assortments of cooked meat locally known as 'dibitair'. The town has a number of higher learning centers. The town has three Lower Basic Schools; Soma Proper, Soma New and Notre Dame Lower Basic School. Soma Senior Secondary School is located at Sare Mawdo neighborhood of the town and Tahir Senior Secondary School attract thousands of students to the town. Soma has seen a robust response from its citizens living abroad and locally by forming associations to initiate developments to the town. Soma Sitaba Foundation for Development and Soma One Big Family are two important charitable organizations in town. Association Of Soma-America that is formed by Soma people in America is also aimed to fulfill similar purposes.

The Kaira Konko Lodge, a scout camp, is located in Soma, on the banks of the River Gambia.
