= West African Young Parliamentarians Network =

African professional network

The West Africa Young Parliamentarians Network (WAYPA) is a regional parliamentary network of young legislators in and around West Africa. The network was created to promote youth participation in governance, strengthen cooperation among young parliamentarians, and support youth-responsive policy, peacebuilding, democratic participation, and regional development across West Africa. The network is currently led by Abdoulie Njai from The Gambia.
