= History of the Gambia =

The earliest inhabitants of The Gambia are unknown, but they left behind large shell middens and enigmatic stone circles attesting to diverse subsistence strategies and well-organized, hierarchical societies. In the 13th century, the Mali Empire expanded into the Gambia river valley, where Mandinka warriors and traders founded (or took over) numerous small states.

The first Europeans to visit the Gambia River were the Portuguese in the 15th century. The opening of seaborne trade made the region economically important for Mali and the rival Jolof Empire. When Mali collapsed in 1599, the former vassal kingdoms were free to set their own policy towards each other and the newcomers.

1677 saw the beginning of a century-and-a-half-long struggle between the English and French for control over seaborne trade in the Gambia and Senegal. The English possessions were captured several times by the French, but in the Treaty of Utrecht in 1713, the British rights to the region were recognized by the French, but European physical presence remained limited.

This changed in the early 19th century, when Captain Alexander Grant was sent to re-establish a British presence on the Gambia river. He established Bathurst which was renamed as Banjul after independence in 1965 and the British possessions continued to grow in size through a series of treaties. Mostly administered in conjunction with other colonies, and nearly sold to France on several occasions, it was established as the separate Colony, and Protectorate in 1894.

In 1901, legislative and executive councils were established for the Gambia, and in the 1920s Edward Francis Small led the push for emancipation, founding the Bathurst Trade Union and the Ratepayers' Association, which laid the foundation for local Gambian participation in the colonial government for the first time. Following World War II, the push towards self-government increased its pace, and the House of Representatives was established in 1960. Pierre Sarr N'Jie served as Chief Minister from 1961 to 1962, though following the 1962 election Dawda Jawara became prime minister, beginning the People's Progressive Party's dominance of Gambian politics for the next thirty years. Full internal self-government was achieved in 1963, and following extensive negotiations, the Gambia declared independence in 1965.

In 1970 the country became a presidential republic, with Dawda Jawara elected as the first president. He survived an attempted coup in 1981, and briefly led his country into the Senegambia Confederation. In 1994, Jawara was overthrown in another coup d'état led by Yahya Jammeh, who ruled as a military dictator for two years before being elected president in 1996 and continuing in this role until 2017. In the 2016 election, Adama Barrow was elected president, backed by a coalition of opposition parties. Jammeh's refusal to step down led to a constitutional crisis and the intervention of ECOWAS forces, but he was eventually forced into exile.

== Early History ==
There were organized societies in the area that would become The Gambia by at least 2000 BC, when a coastal people made large shell middens were created up and down the coast of Senegambia, from the Casamance to the Senegal delta.

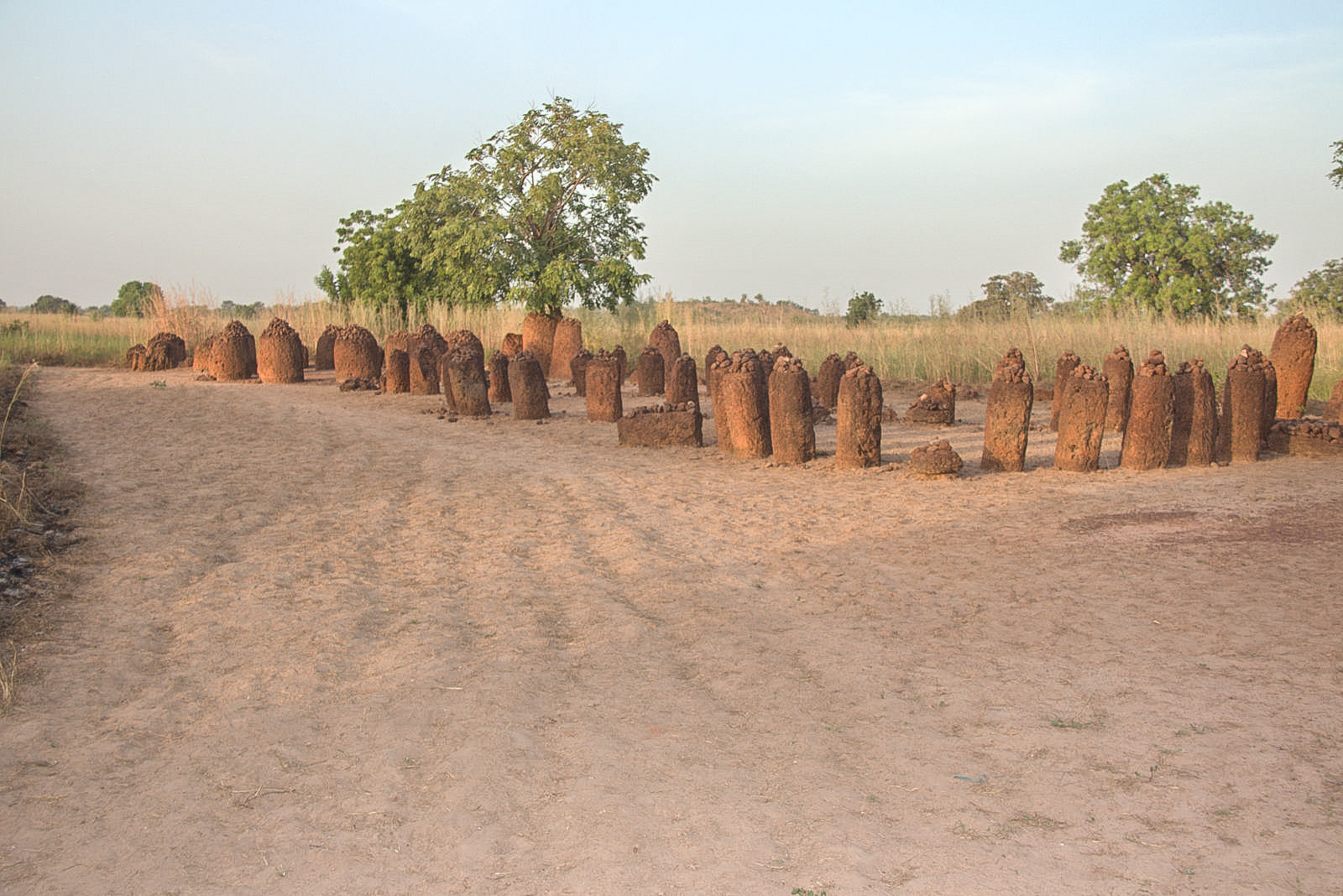
Senegambian stone circles at Wassu; burials nearby date to c. AD 927–1305 but the age of the stone circles is unknown.

The Gambia hosts numerous stone circles, built as part of a funerary culture stretching from approximately the 3rd century BCE to the 16th century CE. Burial mounds near the Wassu complex have been dated to AD 927–1305, although it is not clear whether the burial mounds were constructed before or after the stone circles. The construction of these large stone monuments indicates a prosperous and organized society that could dedicate significant labor to building such structures. The stones were extracted from laterite quarries using iron tools, with identical pillars made, either cylindrical or polygonal, up to two meters high and weighing seven tons.

There is no consensus among historians and archaeologists as to who built these megalithic structures. The Senegalese historian and anthropologist Cheikh Anta Diop argued that the Serer people built the monuments and many similar ones across the Sahel during a hypothesized migration from the Nile River valley. Wolof and Fula oral traditions also have the Serer as the builders. The Serer themselves, however, credit them to the Soos wee or Soos waa Kaabu, the 'men from the beginning of Kaabu'. These 'Soos' or 'Sose' are, in Serer oral history, the former occupants of the area. Their identity is also a matter of debate among historians. Some believe that they were a group speaking a Mande language who migrated from the Wagadu Empire to flee a drought towards the end of the first millennium CE. According to this theory, the Sose were assimilated or displaced when the Serers of the north arrived in the 11th century, although the newcomers may have adopted their funerary customs. Other historians point out that there is a Serer matrilineage named 'Soos', whose members may have been the first of the immigrants to arrive in the Sine-Saloum region. In any case, the Serer have used funerary houses similar to those found at the Wanar site up until the present.

The Bainuk may have also lived north of the Gambia during this period. A Bainuk kingdom did exist south of the river, ruling from the Gambia to the Cacheu.

The ancestors of the Serer left Takrur in the 11th century, fleeing an increasingly militant Islamization policy directed by king War Jabi and his successors. Upon arriving in the region north of the Gambia river, they may have absorbed their predecessors, giving rise to funerary practices similar to those uncovered at the Wanar stone circle site in Senegal. The construction of the monumental circles and standing stones dates almost exclusively from the 11th to the late 13th century.

== The Age of Mali ==
In the early 13th century, Sundiata Keita defeated Soumaoro Kante and established the Mali Empire, with a heartland in the Niger River valley. During his reign, campaigns westwards brought much of Senegambia under his control. According to oral tradition, Tiramakhan Traore was sent to avenge a diplomatic insult by the King of Jolof, and moved into the sparsely inhabited but fertile lands ruled by the Bainuk people with a large, armed following. Traore defeated and killed the Jolof buurba in a battle on the north bank of the Gambia River, then crossed the river and founded numerous towns on the south bank. Among Traore's followers was supposedly the semi-legendary first king of Wuli, Mbari Kajo Wali. Traore and the main force, meanwhile, moved south. He defeated the Bainuk, and his descendants established the province of Kaabu along the headwaters of the Gambia, Casamance, and Cacheu Rivers.

There were Mande traders and immigrants all throughout the region, but they had up until this point mostly been politically and demographically dominated by local hosts of other cultures. Backed by the military might of the Mali Empire, Mandinka kingdoms conquered and ruled the savannah. Meanwhile, the swampy areas near the coast were still dominated by the natives. As in many places that saw Mandinka migrations, much of the native population was dominated or assimilated, with slaves either eventually being integrated into Mandinka society or sold via the trans-Sahara trade routes to Arab buyers. Although the rulers of Kaabu were Mandinka, many of their subjects were from ethnic groups who had resided in the region before the Mandinka invasion. Mandinka became a lingua franca used for trade.

Some modern-day historians have proposed that the Mandinka elite the Gambian kingdoms did not, in fact, immigrate from the Manding region but may have come much earlier, from Bambouk and the upper Senegal River valley. The migration story may be a dramatization of what was actually a gradual process of ethnic transformation under Mali's cultural and political hegemony.

=== Rise of the Jolof Empire ===
In the 1360s, during a struggle over the Malian throne, Ndiadiane Ndiaye broke away to form the independent Jolof Empire in what is now northern Senegal. The other states in the region were quickly conquered or joined willingly, with their ruling classes and populations gradually 'Wolofized'. Oral traditions emphasize that the empire started as a voluntary confederacy of states rather than through military conquest, an explanation accepted by many historians. Others, however, believe that these traditions mask a more difficult reality, and that the process of imperial growth may not have been peaceful.

Taking advantage of Mali's weakness, Buurba Biram Njeme Eler, was likely responsible for subduing the Mandinka states on the northern bank of the Gambia, including Niumi, Baddibu, Nyani, and Wuli. Control over these kingdoms gave the Buurba some access to the growing commerce there.

=== Opening of European Trade ===
Beginning in the 1440s, Portuguese ships first arrived on the coast of West Africa, initially looking only to capture slaves. In 1446 Nuno Tristao may have reached the Gambia, or perhaps the Saloum Delta. His raiding party was ambushed by thirteen Niuminka canoes with some 80 armed men and killed by poisoned arrows.

It wasn't until 1455 that the Portuguese tried again. A Venetian called Alvise Cadamosto and a Genoese trader called Antoniotto Usodimare , working for the Portuguese prince Henry the Navigator, arrived off the mouth of the Gambia River with a fleet of four heavily armed ships. As his caravels moved up the river, the Portuguese were attacked by a fleet of war-canoes. Despite their initial shock at the range and power of the European cannon, the locals (Malian subjects) attempted to board the smallest caravel before finally being driven off. When he tried to negotiate, Cadamosto was told that the Malians believed that the white men were cannibals who had come to kidnap and eat Africans. He fled the river without capturing and slaves or trading.

The next year the Portuguese abandoned their slave raiding in favor of trade and negotiation. Cadamosto successfully conducted business with the Gambians, learning they were subjects of the Mansa of Mali and that their marines were the ones who had forced his retreat the previous year. Diogo Gomes also arrived with orders from the Portuguese crown to end hostilities with the Jolof Empire and Mali Empire and set up normal trade. He sailed some 250 miles upriver, reaching as far as the major market town of Cantor, an entrepot of the gold trade.

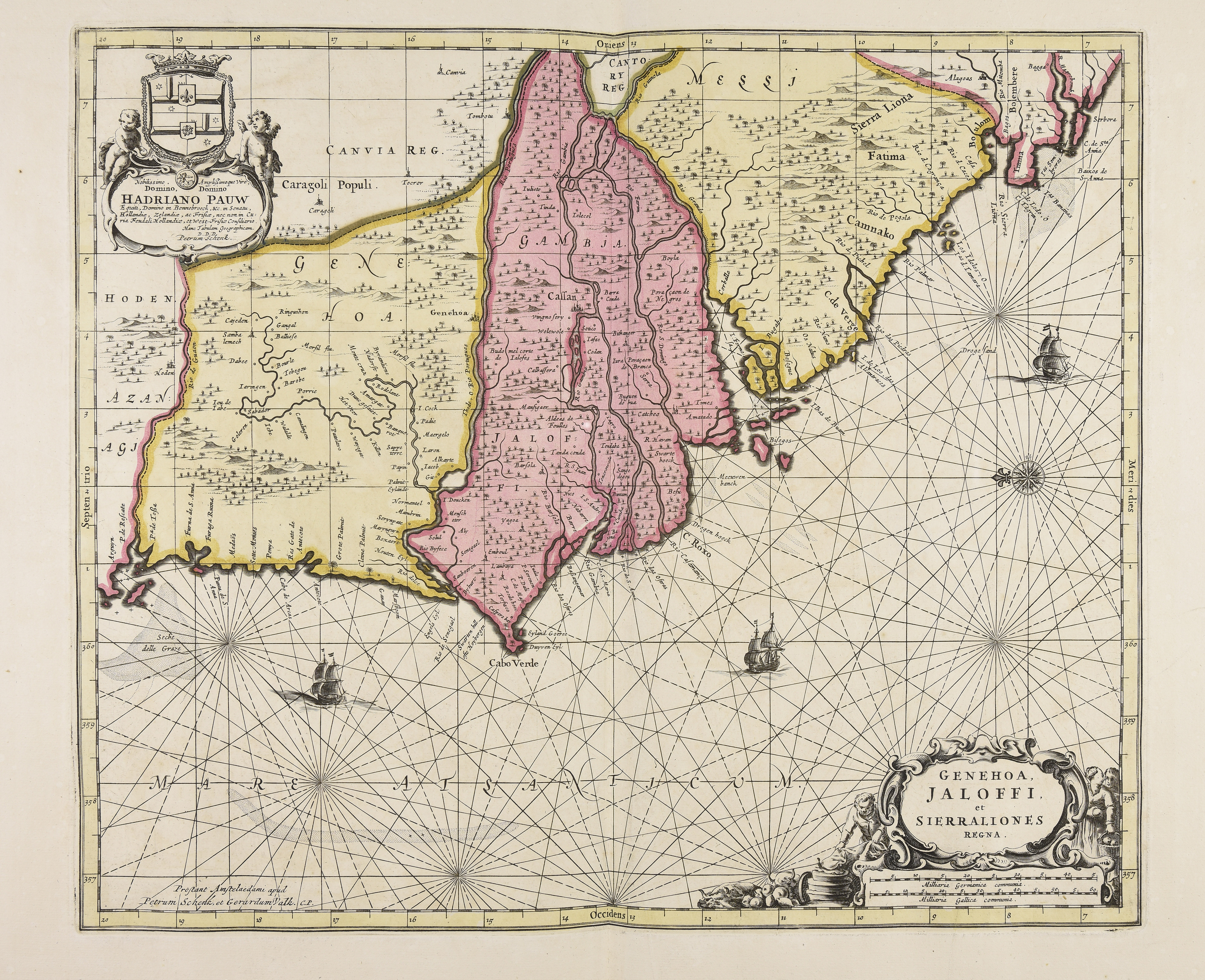
An early map of Senegambia

Over the following centuries, many Portuguese lancados set up along the river, but never in large numbers. Many of the settlers intermarried with the natives while maintaining Portuguese dress and customs and professing to be Christians. Communities of Portuguese descent continued to exist in the Gambia until the 18th century, with Portuguese churches existing at San Domingo, Geregia and Tankular in 1730. The further Portuguese settlement up the river was at Sutukoba near Fattatenda. European trade, especially the sale of horses, iron, and eventually guns, would profoundly alter the balance of power in Senegambia, giving an advantage to states that could tap into the new seaborne trade routes.

=== Koli Tenguella ===
Meanwhile, the Mali Empire faced a new threat: the Fula warlord Tenguella. By the 1490s he and his son Koli Tenguella had taken control of much of the Futa Jallon and upper Senegal River valley. From his base in the mountains, Koli attacked the kingdoms of Wuli and Niani on the north bank of the Gambia River and threatened Malian control of the gold-producing Bambouk region. Cut off from the desert-side trade, Mali's economy now depended heavily on maintaining strong links with these western provinces and the trade with the Portuguese.

Mali Empire and surrounding states, c. 1530

=== Malian Retreat ===
In 1512, Tenguella was defeated and killed in battle by the Songhai. This gave Mali an opportunity to drive his son Koli out of the Futa Jallon, re-establishing consistent communication with the Gambia. Soon afterwards, the Jolof Empire fell apart after the 1549 Battle of Danki. Mali re-asserted their traditional predominance over southern Senegambia and the flourishing Atlantic trade. The Wuli became the principal Malian vassal in the region thanks to its strategic position at the head of navigation on the Gambia River and the presence of the thriving market of Sutukoba, in what is now Wuli East District.

European competition for coastal trade was intensifying in this period. Two English ships piloted by a Portuguese refugee, Francisco Ferreira, sailed to the Gambia in 1587 and returned with a profitable cargo of hides and ivory. In 1588, António, Prior of Crato, who had a claim to the throne of Portugal, sold to London and Devon merchants the exclusive right to trade between the Rivers Senegal and Gambia. This grant was confirmed to the grantees for a period of ten years by letters patent of Queen Elizabeth I. The merchants sent several ships to the coast, but, owing to Portuguese hostility, did not venture further south than Joal: 30 miles to the north of the river mouth. They reported that the Gambia was "a river of secret trade and riches concealed by the Portuguese."

The 1590 Moroccan invasion of the Songhai Empire and their subsequent victory at the Battle of Tondibi opened a massive power vacuum at the heart of West Africa. The Denianke reacted quickly to the opportunity, finally ousting Mali from the critical Bambuk region. Cut off from the western provinces, Mansa Mahmud IV attempted to capture the critical trade city of Djenne in the Inner Niger Delta, but was catastrophically defeated in 1599. The Mali Empire disintegrated, and its former vassals along the Gambia were left to chart independent courses.

== 17th century ==
=== English exploration ===
In 1612, an attempt by the French to settle in the Gambia ended disastrously due to sickness spreading among the settlers. Letters patent conferring the right of the exclusive trade with the River Gambia were subsequently granted again in 1598, 1618 and 1632 to other English adventurers, but no attempts were made by the English to explore until 1618. An expedition that year was commanded by George Thomson and its objective was to open up trade with Timbuktu. Leaving his ships at Gassan, Thompson proceeded with a small party in boats as far as the River Neriko. During his absence, the crew of his ship were massacred by the Portuguese. However, some of his party managed on their return to make their way overland to Cape Verde and then to England. Thomson remained in the Gambia with seven companions but was killed by one of them in a sudden dispute.

In the meantime, a relief expedition had departed from England under the command of Richard Jobson, who seized some Portuguese shipping as a reprisal for the massacre at Gassan. Jobson also made his way up to Neriko and subsequently gave a very positive account of the commercial opportunities of the River Gambia. During his expedition, Jobson refused slaves offered by an African merchant, Buckor Sano. He said that "we were a people who did not deal in such commodities, neither did we buy or sell one another, or any that had our own shapes." His protests were noted as "exceptional" by Hugh Thomas. However, both his and Thompson's expedition had resulted in significant losses and a subsequent voyage that he made in 1624 proved a complete failure. After a loss of £5,000, the patentees made no further attempts to exploit the resources of the Gambia but confined their attention to the Gold Coast.

In 1651, the Commonwealth of England granted a patent to certain London merchants who in that and the following year sent two expeditions to the River Gambia and established a trading post at Bintang. Members of the expedition proceeded as far as the Barakunda Falls in search of gold, but the climate took its toll. In 1652, Prince Rupert of the Rhine entered the Gambia with three Royalist ships and captured the patentees' vessels. After this heavy loss, they abandoned any further enterprise in the Gambia.

=== Courlander Gambia and English reclamation ===
During this, Jacob Kettler, the Duke of Courland, had in 1651 obtained from several native chiefs the cession of St Andrew's Island and land at Banyon Point (also known as Half-Die), Juffure and Gassan. Settlers, merchants and missionaries were sent out from Courland and forts were erected on St Andrew's Island and at Banyon Point. This was part of a period in Courlander history known as Couronian colonization, which also saw them colonise Tobago. The Courlanders believed that the possession of these territories would give them control over the river and enable them to levy tolls on all those who used the waterway. They erected a fort built out of local sandstone, appointed a Lutheran pastor, and positioned the cannons on the island so as to command both of the channels to the north and the south. The plan was to sell slaves to the colony in Tobago, but this did not prosper. In 1658, Kettler was made a prisoner by the Swedes during a war between Sweden and Poland. As a consequence, funds were no longer available to maintain the garrisons and settlements in the Gambia and in 1659, the Duke of Courland's agent at Amsterdam entered into an agreement with the Dutch West India Company whereby the Duke's possessions in the Gambia were handed over to the company.

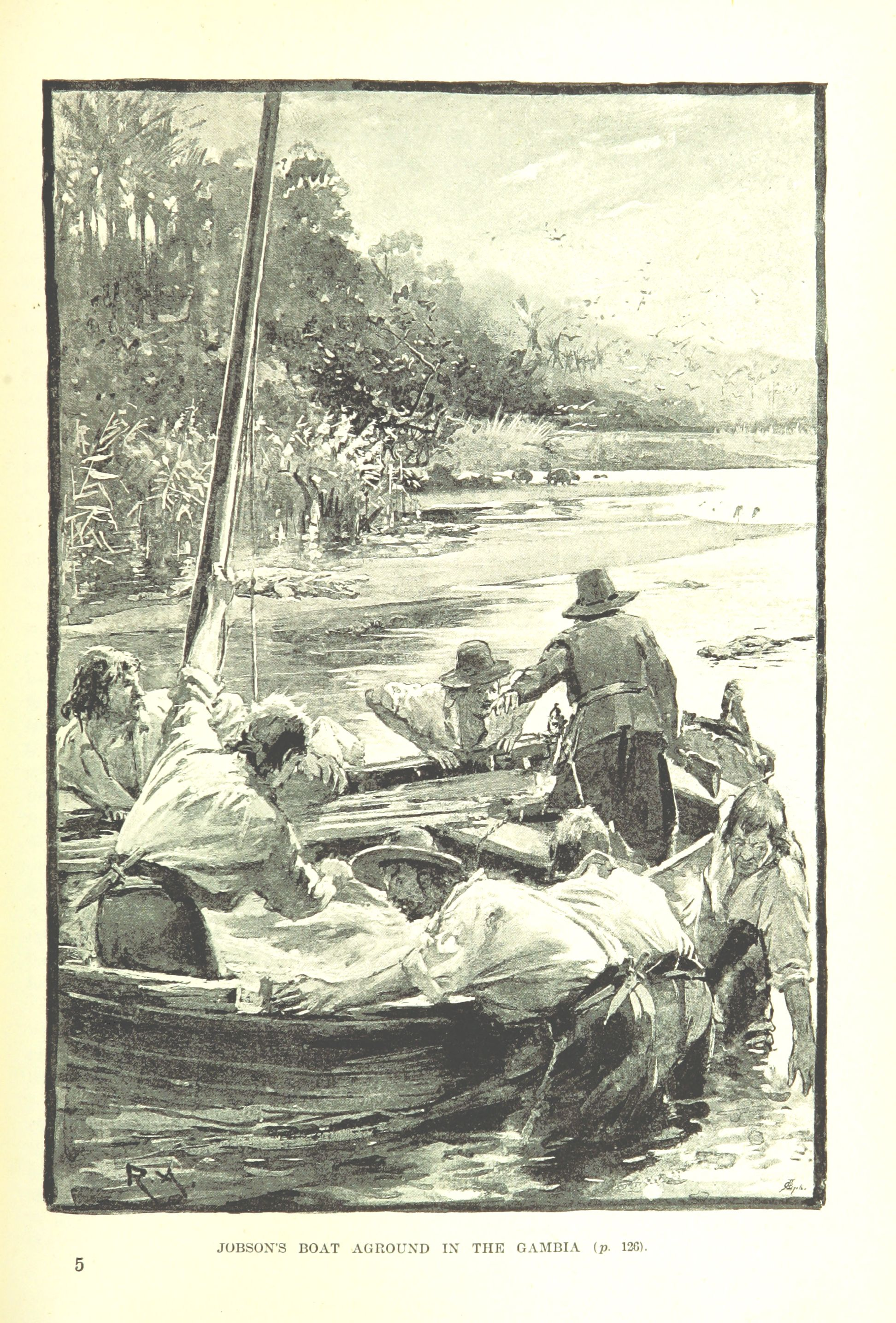
Illustration of Richard Jobson in the Gambia in 1620–21.

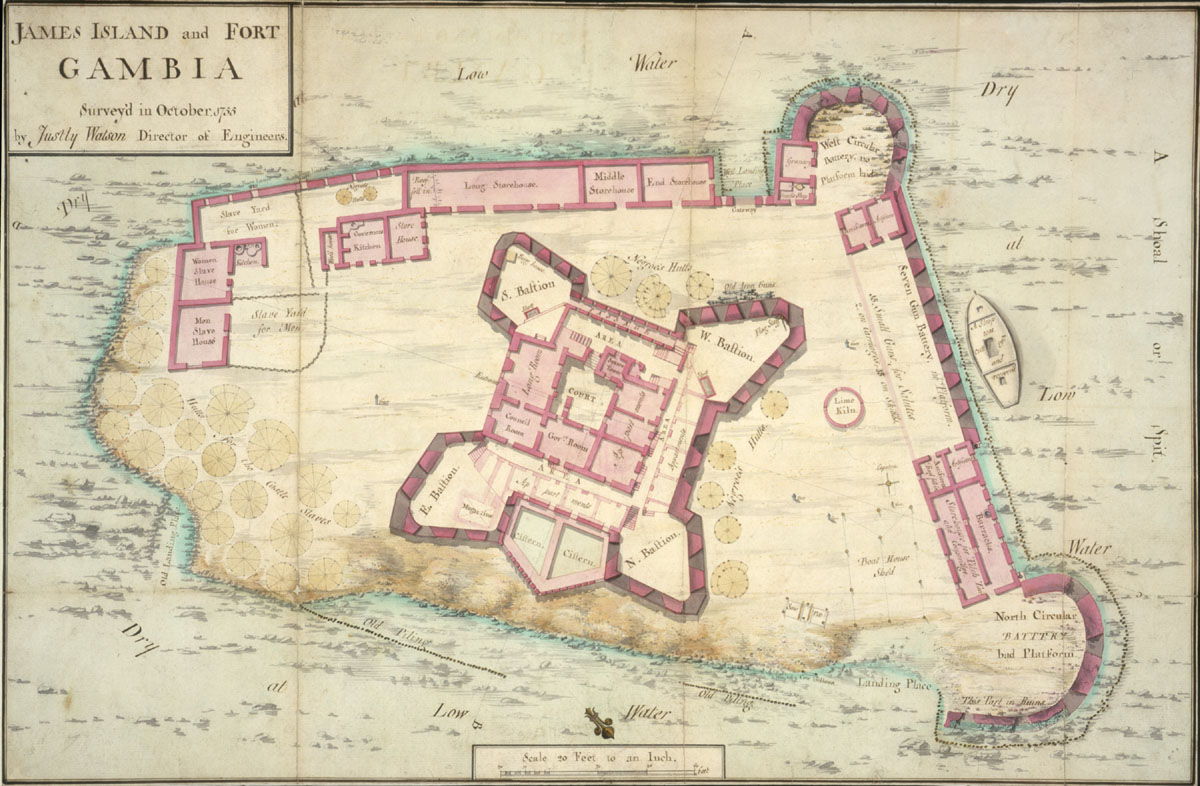
A map of James Island and Fort Gambia

In 1660, the fort on St Andrew's Island was captured and plundered by a French privateer in Swedish service. The Dutch thereafter abandoned the fort and the Courlanders resumed possession. After the Restoration of the English monarchy in 1660, English interest in the Gambia was revived due to the reported existence of a gold mine in the upper reaches of the river. A new patent was granted to a number of people who were styled as the Royal Adventurers in Africa Company. The most prominent among them were James, Duke of York, and Prince Rupert. At the end of the year, the Adventurers dispatched an expedition to the Gambia under the command of Robert Holmes, who had been with Prince Rupert in the Gambia in 1652.

Holmes arrived at the river mouth at the beginning of 1661. He proceeded to occupy Dog Island, which he renamed Charles Island, and to establish a temporary fort there. On 18 March 1661, he sailed up to St Andrew's Island and called on the Courlander officer-in-charge to surrender, threatening to bombard the fort if his request was ignored. There were only seven Europeans in the garrison, and the Courlanders had no alternative but to submit. On the following day, Holmes took possession of the fort, which was renamed James Fort after the Duke of York. An attempt was made in 1662 by the Dutch West India Company to gain possession of the fort. Firstly, they attempted to incite the natives of Barra against the English, secondly they offered bribes to certain English officers, and, lastly, they attempted to bombard the fort. None of these efforts were successful and the English remained in control.

=== Trader control ===
Meanwhile, the Duke of Courland had lodged a protest against the seizure of his possessions in a time of peace. On 17 November 1664, after negotiations over the future of the territories, he relinquished in favour of Charles II all claims to his African possessions and in return was granted the island of Tobago and the right for himself to personally trade in the River Gambia.

From the mid-seventeenth century onwards, "English, Dutch, French and Baltic merchant adventurers shared and fought over trading rights from the restricted, neighbouring bases of Fort James Island and Albreda."

In 1667, the Royal Adventurers sublet their rights between Capes Blanco and Palmas to another body of adventurers, who became known as the Gambia Adventurers. They were to exploit the Rivers Gambia, Sierra Leone, and Sherbro.This group of adventurers enjoyed these rights for only a year, when, on the expiration of their lease, they reverted to the Royal African Company, which had purchased the rights and property of the Royal Adventurers six years earlier.

In 1677, the French wrested the island of Gorée from the Dutch. This began a century and a half period of struggle between England and France for political and commercial supremacy in the regions of Senegal and the Gambia. By 1681, the French had acquired a small enclave at Albreda opposite to James Island. Except for short period, during which trouble with the natives of Barra or hostilities with England compelled them to temporarily abandon the place, they retained a foothold there until 1857.

== 18th century ==
=== African Company turmoil and prosperity ===
In the wars with France following the Glorious Revolution, James Fort was captured on four occasions by the French, in 1695, 1702, 1704 and 1708. However, no attempt was made by France to occupy the fort permanently. At the Treaty of Utrecht in 1713, the French recognised the right of the English to James Island and their settlements on the River Gambia. One of the results of these wars was an outbreak of piracy along the West African coast. The English trade in the Gambia suffered heavily from the efforts of the pirates. In 1719, one pirate, Howel Davis, captured James Fort. In 1721, part of the garrison of the fort mutinied under the leadership of Captain John Massey, seizing one of the company's ships and turning pirate. Finally, in 1725, James Fort was extensively damaged by an accidental explosion of gunpowder.

Following these incidents, the Royal African Company benefited from 20 years of comparative prosperity. Factories were established as far up the river as Fattatenda and at other places and a fairly considerable trade was carried out with the interior of Africa. Nevertheless, despite an annual subsidy from the British government for the maintenance of their forts, the Royal African Company became involved in serious financial difficulties. In 1749, James Island was found to be "in a most miserable condition". In the following year, it was reported that the garrison at James Fort had been reduced through sickness from around 30 men to between five and eight, and that, with all the officers being dead, a common soldier had succeeded to the command.

By 1750, the position had become critical and an Act of Parliament was passed divesting the Royal African Company of its charter and divesting its forts and settlements into a new company, controlled by a committee of merchants. The Act prohibited the new company from trading in its corporate capacity but allowed it an annual subsidy for the upkeep of the forts. It was hoped that this would prevent the monopolistic tendencies of rule by a joint stock company and at the same time to save the government the expense entailed by the creation of a colonial civil service.

=== Senegambia colony ===
In 1766, the fort and settlements were taken from this new company by another Act of Parliament and given to the Crown. For the next 18 years, the Gambia formed part of the Senegambia colony. The government headquarters were at St Louis at the mouth of the Senegal River and a Lieutenant Governor was appointed to take charge of James Fort and the settlements in the Gambia. In 1779, the French captured James Fort for the fifth and final time. On this occasion, they so successfully demolished the fortifications that at the close of the war it was found impossible to rebuild them. Besides a brief period following the Napoleonic Wars, when the island was temporarily occupied by a handful of soldiers as an outpost, James Island stopped playing any part in the history of the Gambia.

In 1780, the French privateer Senegal captured four vessels which had been part of the British garrison at Goree sent to the Bintang Creek under the command of Major Houghton to obtain building material. The Senegal, in turn, was captured by HMS Zephyr after an engagement off Barra Point. In 1783, St Louis and Goree were handed back to France and Senegambia ceased existing as a British colony.

=== Abandonment ===
It was once again handed back to the Royal African Company. However, they made no attempt to administer the Gambia. In 1785, Lemain Island was acquired by the British government with the view of the establishment of a convict settlement, but nothing came of the plan. For the next thirty years, British influence in the Gambia was confined to the operations of a small number of traders. Settlements were established by these traders along the river banks. Among these settlements, the most important probably was Pisania. This settlement, which was already in operation by 1779, was occupied by Dr John Laidley and a family by the name of Aynsley. Subsequently, Laidley and the Aynsleys rendered invaluable assistance to Major Daniel Houghton in 1790, Mungo Park in 1795 and 1805, and Major William Grey in 1818, in the course of their journeys into the interior of Africa.

== 19th century ==
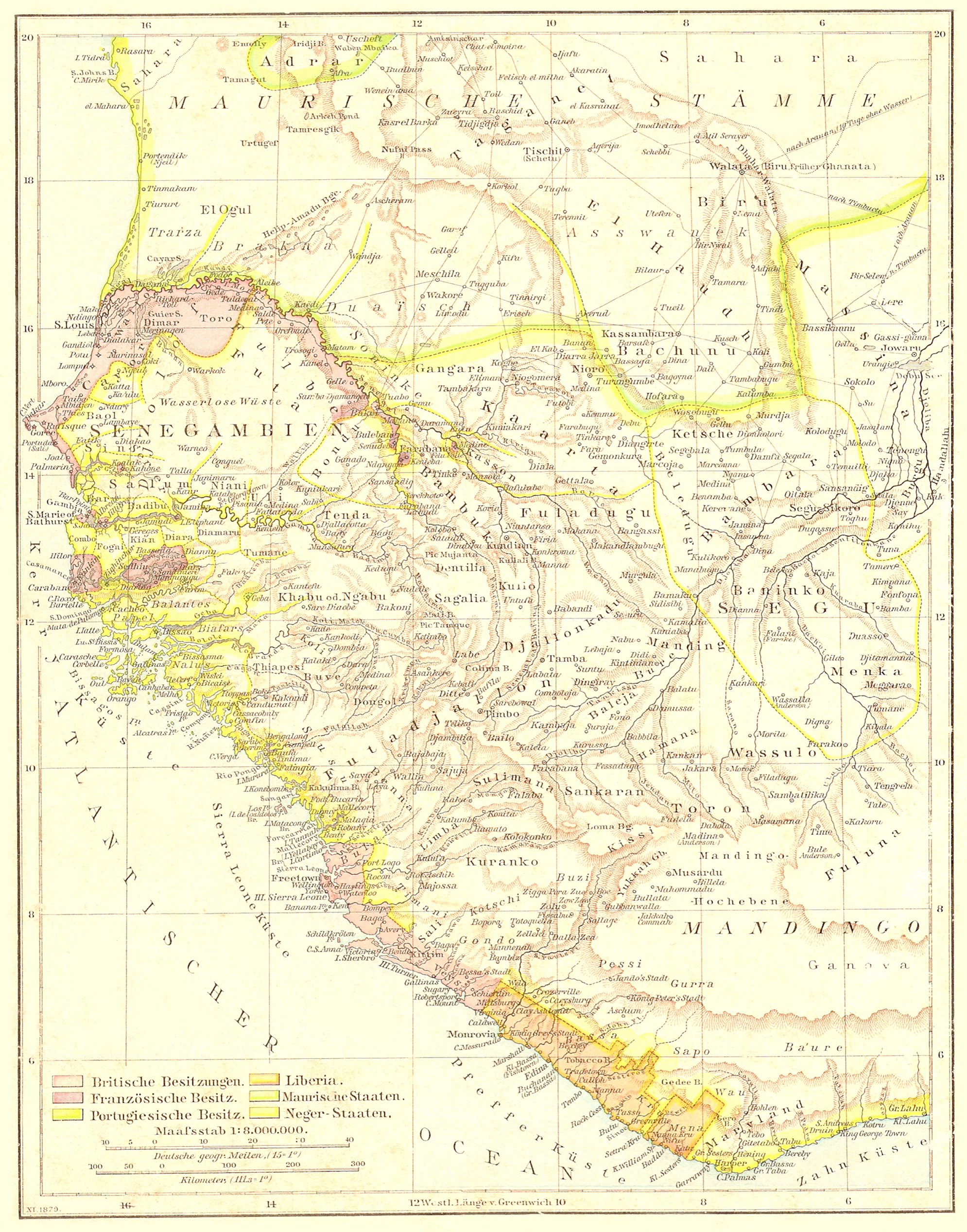
1881 map of Senegambia Full resolution

=== Early 19th century ===
At the beginning of the 19th century, Montgomery identified that most settlements on the Gambia River were British. However, to the north, there were several native kingdoms, including Barra, Boor Salum, Yani and Woolli. At the time, Barra had a population of 200,000 and its capital was Barra Inding, although the main trading place was Jillifrey. Boor Salum had a population of 300,000 and the smaller kingdoms of Yani and Woolli were to the north of it. The Mandinka people were the inhabitants of all four kingdoms, which all conducted a considerable trade with the interior of Africa. Montgomery said that no considerable kingdom existed south of the Gambia.

In 1807, the African slave trade was abolished by an Act of Parliament. At that time, the British were in control of Goree. With the help of the Royal Navy, the Goree garrison made efforts to suppress the slave traders operating in the River Gambia, who were primarily Spanish and American. On more than one occasion, the slavers offered a stubborn resistance and the Royal African Corps suffered several casualties.

The raison d'etre of the West African forts had been the protection of the slave trade. What was to happen when that trade was abolished? No effort had been made to penetrate the interior and nothing in the nature of colonization had been attempted. At first these posts remained useful for the purposes of suppressing the slave trade.

— H. E. Egerton, Oxford Survey of the British Empire, Vol. VI, p. 141

=== British recolonisation ===
Following the Treaty of Paris in 1814, which ended the war with the French, the British forces and officials on the island of evacuated Gorée. Captain Alexander Grant was sent with a detachment of Royal African Corps soldiers to explore the possibility of rebuilding Fort James on James Island but decided that more space would be provided by St Mary's Island. Grant made a treaty with the King of Kombo on 23 April 1816 that ceded the island to the UK. He also founded the town of Bathurst on St Mary's Island. In 1821, the Royal African Company was dissolved by Act of Parliament and the Gambia was placed under the jurisdiction of the Governor of Sierra Leone. It continued to be administered from Sierra Leone until 1843 when it became a separate colony. In 1866, however, the Gambia and Sierra Leone were once again united under the same administration.

The British government continued to extend its territorial acquisitions beyond St Mary's Island by concluding treaties with a number of native chiefs. Lemain Island, 160 miles up the river, was ceded to the United Kingdom in 1823 by King Collie and renamed as MacCarthy Island. Georgetown was established on the island as a military barracks and settlement for liberated slaves. In 1826, the Ceded Mile, a one-mile strip on the north bank of the River Gambia, was ceded by the King of Barra. Fattatenda and the surrounding district was ceded in 1829. In 1840 and 1853, considerable areas of the mainland adjoining St Mary's Island were obtained from the King of Kombo for the settlement of discharged soldiers of the West India Regiments and liberated Africans. Cessions of another land further upstream were obtained at various dates, including Albreda, the French enclave, which was obtained in 1857.

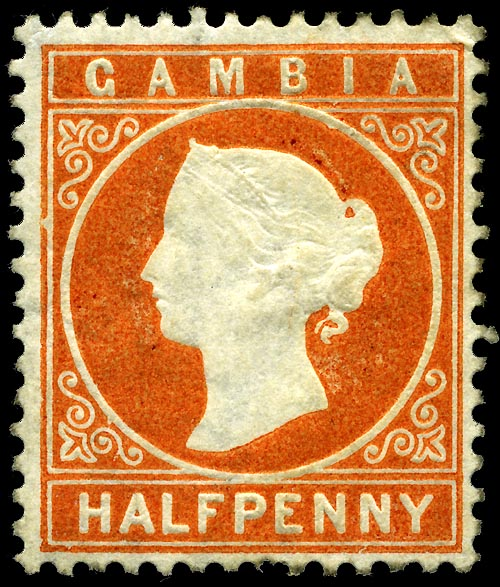
An 1880 stamp from Gambia

Flag of the British colony of Gambia

=== Consolidation as a colony ===
In the 1850s, under the leadership of Louis Faidherbe, the French colony of Senegal began a vigorous expansion until it virtually engulfed the Gambia. The colony assumed an importance to the French as a possible trade route, proposed cession of the Gambia for some other part of West Africa was first mooted in 1861. It was seriously discussed again during 1865 and 1866. In 1870 and 1876, negotiations were entered into between the French and British government over the proposed cession of the Gambia in exchange for other territories in West Africa.

However, the proposal aroused such opposition in Parliament and among various mercantile bodies in England, as well as among the native inhabitants of the Gambia, that the British government was unable to press ahead with the scheme. This "remarkably powerful" Gambia lobby was revived whenever the topic of the proposed cession was brought up, and successfully saw that the British could not cede any land. In 1888, the Gambia was once again separated from Sierra Leone and from that date until its independence operated as a separate colony. In 1889, an agreement was reached between the French and British governments for the delimitation of the borders of the Gambia, Senegal, and Casamance.

During this time, despite a number of small wars with the natives, the Gambian government was able to conclude a series of treaties with the chiefs living along the banks of the river. Some of these included the cession of small tracts of territory, but most conferred British protection. The last and most important of these was concluded in 1901 with Musa Molloh, the paramount chief of Fuladu. In 1894, an Ordinance was passed for the better administration of these districts which had not been ceded but merely placed under the protection of the British government. It was decided that it was not feasible to administer these places from the seat of government in Bathurst, so in 1895 and the following years, ordinances were passed to bring these places under the control of the Protectorate. Finally, a Protectorate Ordinance passed in 1902 brought the whole of the Gambia besides St Mary's Island under the Protectorate system.

== 20th century ==
=== Early years ===
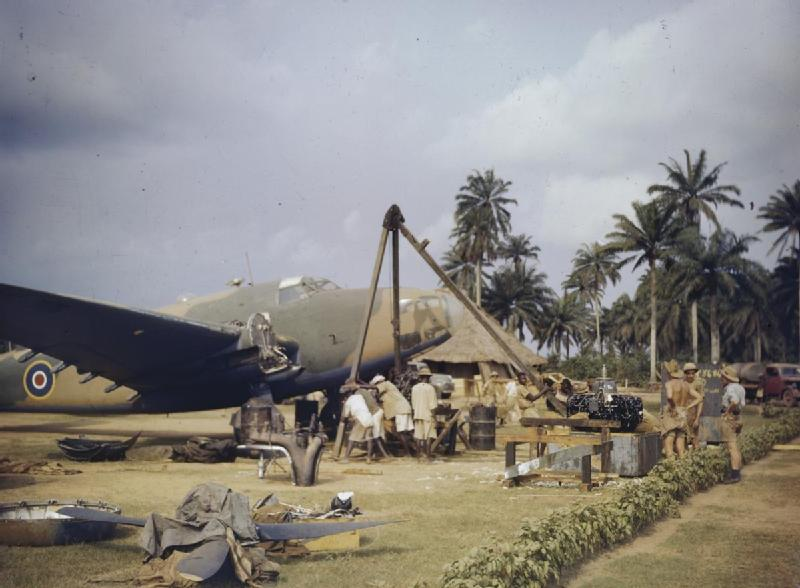
Royal Air Force fitters assisted by native helpers change the engine of a Lockheed Hudson aircraft at a West African base (probably Yundum) using an improvised hoist (1943)

The Gambia received its own executive and legislative councils in 1901 and gradually progressed toward self-government. Also in 1901, the Gambia Company, the first colonial military unit of the Gambia, was founded. It was formed as part of the Sierra Leone Battalion of the new West African Frontier Force (late Royal West African Frontier Force). A 1906 ordinance abolished slavery.

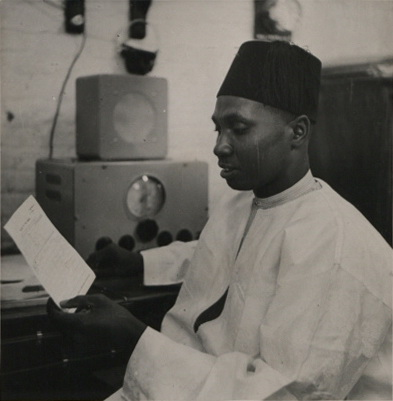
A. M. Jobe, the Postmaster of Georgetown, transmits a telegram containing a message of allegiance from the Chiefs to His Majesty the King (1944)

=== World War I and interwar years ===
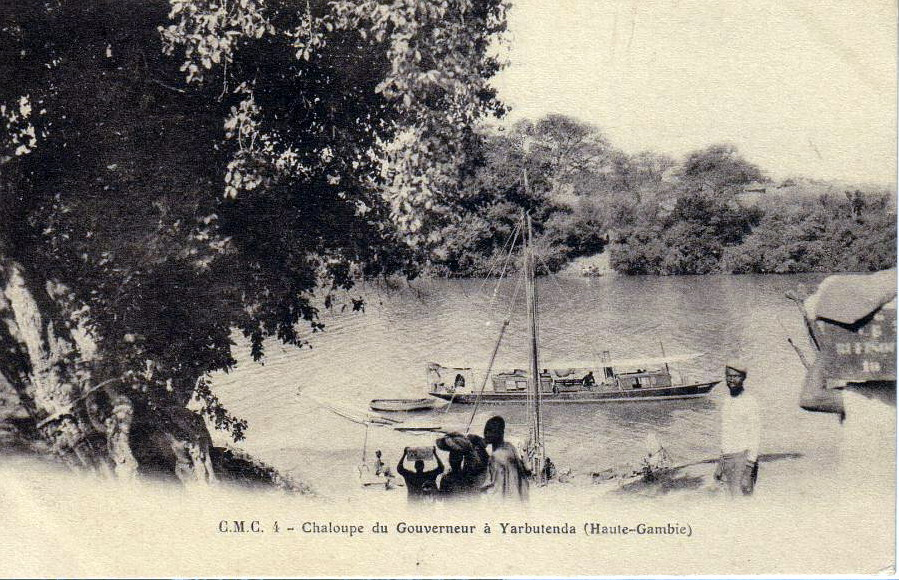
Yarbutenda circa 1904

During World War I, the Gambia Company served alongside other British troops in the Kamerun campaign, under the command of Captain V. B. Thurston of the Dorsetshire Regiment, and a number of its soldiers received gallantry medals for their conduct.

In 1920, the National Congress of British West Africa was formed, an organisation working towards African emancipation, with Edward Francis Small as the sole delegate. He returned and founded the Gambia Section of the Congress, the principal aim of which was to achieved elected representation in the government of the Gambia. It also frequently petitioned against unpopular government policies. It had some success, with Small founding the first Gambian trade union, the Bathurst Trade Union, in 1929. However, it failed to prevent its opponent, Ousman Jeng, being appointed to the Legislative Council in 1922 and again in 1927.

In 1932, Small founded the Rate Payers' Association (RPA) to oppose the unpopular policies of Richmond Palmer, the Governor, and of the conservative elements of Gambian politics, led by Forster and his nephew W. D. Carrol. By the end of 1934, the RPA was winning all the seats on the Bathurst Urban District Council and its successor the Bathurst Advisory Town Council, however, had no representation in the Legislative Council.

=== World War II ===
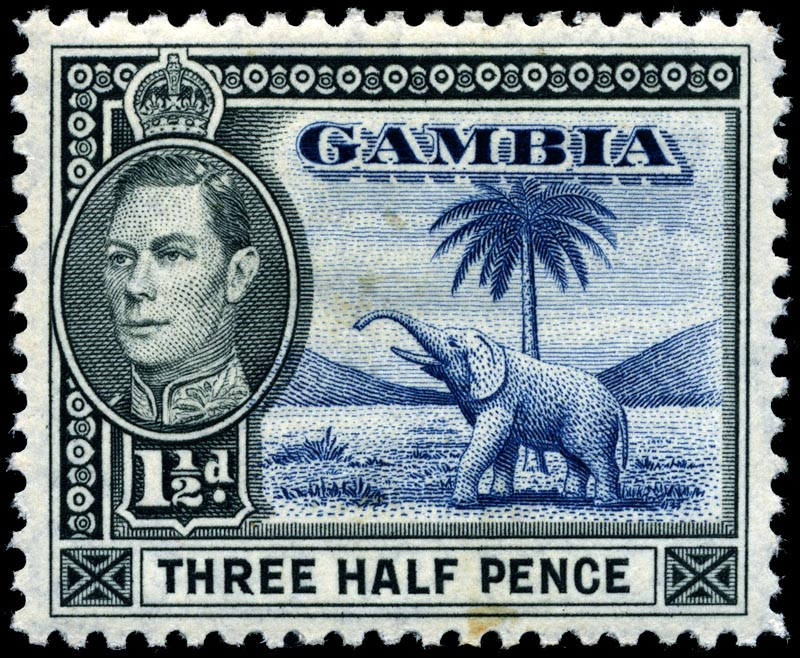
Gambia 1 1/2-pence stamp of 1944

During World War II, the Gambia Company became the Gambia Regiment, with a strength of two battalions from 1941. It fought in the Burma campaign and served for some time under the command of Antony Read, later the Quartermaster-General to the Forces. the Gambia itself was also important to the war effort. It was home to RAF Bathurst, a flying boat base, and RAF Yundum, an RAF station. HMS Melampus, a shore base, was also based at Bathurst for some of the war, and in 1942, a light cruiser named HMS Gambia was launched, which maintained ties to the colony until it was decommissioned in 1960. Bathurst was also the nearest English-speaking port to Dakar, where, before the Battle of Dakar, the Vichy French battleship Richelieu had been told to travel to.

The Gambia was also home to 55 British General Hospital from 1941 to 1942, 40 British General Hospital from 1942 to 1943, and 55 British General Hospital again from 1945 to 1946. During World War II, the Gambia also formed an Auxiliary Police, who, among other things, helped to enforce the blackout in Bathurst. Many air raid shelters were built across the Gambia too. In 1943, Franklin D. Roosevelt, the President of the United States, stopped overnight in Bathurst en route to and from the Casablanca Conference. This marked the first visit to the African continent by a sitting US president. The visit hardened his views against British colonial rule. Appalled, as he was, by the poverty and disease that was present there, he wrote to Churchill describing the territory as a "hell-hole".

=== Post-war reform ===
After the Second World War, the pace of reform increased. The economy of the Gambia, like other African countries at the time, was very heavily orientated towards agriculture. Reliance on the groundnut became so strong that it made up almost the entirety of exports, making the economy vulnerable. Groundnuts were the only commodity subject to export duties; these export duties resulted in the illegal smuggling of the product to French Senegal. Attempts were made to increase production of other goods for export: the Gambian poultry scheme/Yundum egg scheme pioneered by the Colonial Development Corporation aimed to produce twenty million eggs and one million lb of dressed poultry a year. The conditions in the Gambia proved unfavourable and typhoid killed much of the chicken stock, drawing criticism to the corporation.

The River Gambia was the principal route of navigation and transport inland, with a port at Bathurst. The road network was mainly concentrated around Bathurst, with the remaining areas largely connected by dirt roads. The only airport was at Yundum, built in World War II. Post war it was used for passenger flights. Both British South American Airways and the British Overseas Airways Corporation had services, the former moving its service to Dakar, which had a concrete runway (as opposed to pierced steel planking). The airport was rebuilt in 1963 and the building is still in use today.

In anticipation of independence, efforts were made to create internal self-government. The 1960 Constitution created a partly elected House of Representatives, with 19 elected members and 8 chosen by the chiefs. This constitution proved flawed in the 1960 elections when the two major parties tied with 8 seats each. With the support of the unelected chiefs, Pierra Sarr N'Jie of the United Party was appointed Chief Minister. Dawda Jawara of the People's Progressive Party resigned as Minister of Education, triggering a Constitutional Conference arranged by the Secretary of State for the Colonies.

The Constitutional Conference paved the way for a new constitution that granted a greater degree of self-government and a House of Representatives with more elected members. Elections were held in 1962, with Jawara's Progressive Party securing a majority of the elected seats. Under the new constitutional arrangements, Jawara was appointed prime minister: a position he held until it was abolished in 1970. Following general elections in 1962, full internal self-governance was granted in the following year.

=== Independent Gambia ===
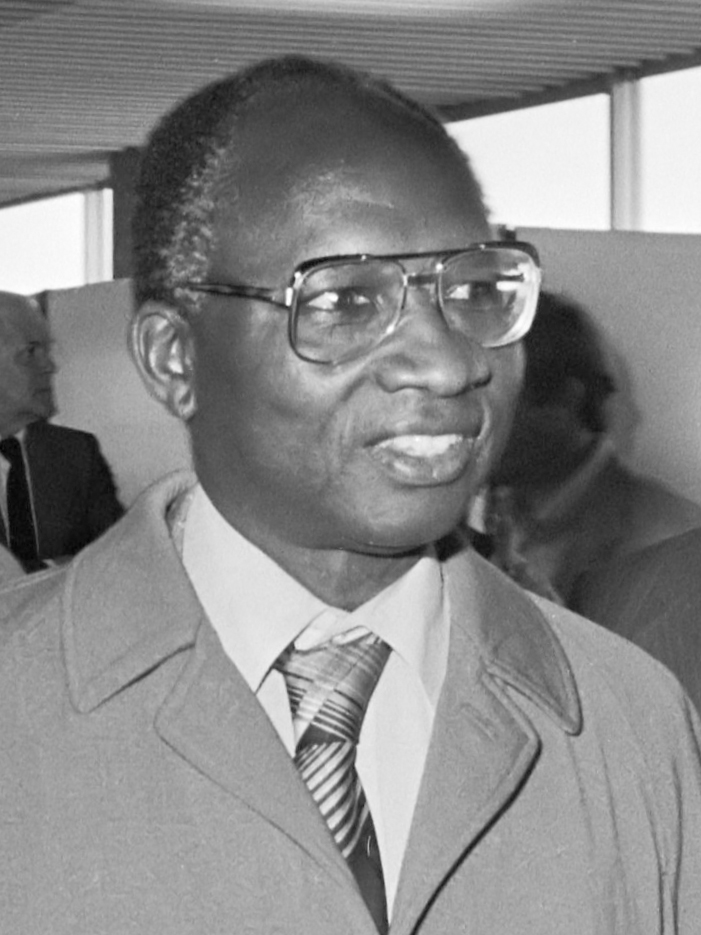
Jawara in 1979

At the Marlborough House constitutional conference in June 1964, it was agreed between the British and Gambian delegations that the Gambia would become an independent country on 18 February 1965. It was agreed that Queen Elizabeth II would remain as the head of state, and a Governor-General would exercise executive powers on her behalf. On 18 February, Prince Edward, Duke of Kent, on behalf of the Queen, formally granted the country independence with Prime Minister Jawara representing the Gambia. It became the 21st independent member of the Commonwealth, with a constitution described as a "sophisticated version of the Westminster export models."

Following agreements between the British and Gambian Governments in July 1964, the Gambia achieved independence on 18 February 1965 as a constitutional monarchy within the Commonwealth.

Shortly thereafter, the government held a referendum proposing that an elected president replace the Queen of the Gambia as head of state. The referendum failed to obtain the two-thirds majority required to amend the constitution, but the results received widespread attention abroad as testimony to the Gambia's observance of secret balloting, honest elections, and civil rights and liberties.

=== Jawara era ===
On 24 April 1970, the Gambia became a republic within the Commonwealth, following a second referendum, with Prime Minister Sir Dawda Kairaba Jawara as head of state.

The relative stability of the Jawara era was first shattered by a coup attempt in 1981. The coup was led by Kukoi Samba Sanyang, who, on two occasions, had unsuccessfully sought election to Parliament. After a week of violence which left several hundred people dead, Jawara, in London when the attack began, appealed to Senegal for help. Senegalese troops defeated the rebel force.

In the aftermath of the attempted coup, Senegal and the Gambia signed the 1982 Treaty of Confederation. The Senegambia Confederation came into existence; it aimed eventually to combine the armed forces of the two states and to unify their economies and currencies. the Gambia withdrew from the confederation in 1989.

Until a military coup in July 1994, the Gambia was led by President Jawara, who was re-elected five times.

=== Jammeh era ===
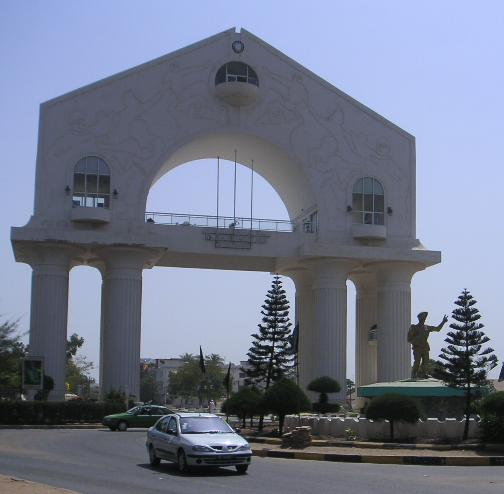
Arch 22 monument, a memorial of the 1994 coup

In July 1994, Yahya Jammeh led a coup d'état that deposed the Jawara government. Between 1994 and 1996, Jammeh ruled as head of the Armed Forces Provisional Ruling Council (AFPRC) and banned opposition political activity. The AFPRC announced a transition plan for a return to democratic civilian rule, establishing the Provisional Independent Electoral Commission (PIEC) in 1996 to conduct national elections. After a constitutional referendum in August, presidential and parliamentary elections were held. Jammeh was sworn into office as president on 6 November 1996. On 17 April 1997 the PIEC transformed into the Independent Electoral Commission (IEC).

Jammeh won both the 2001 and 2006 elections. He was re-elected as president in 2011. The People's Republic of China cut ties with the Gambia in 1995 after the latter established diplomatic links with the Republic of China (Taiwan). The Gambia was elected to a non-permanent seat on the United Nations Security Council from 1998 to 1999.

On 2 October 2013, the Gambian interior minister announced that the Gambia would leave the Commonwealth of Nations with immediate effect, stating that they would "never again be part of a neo-colonial organization"

In December 2014, an attempted coup was launched to overthrow President Jammeh.

=== Fall of Jammeh and Operation Restore Democracy ===
The presidential election of 2016 saw the surprising victory of the opposition candidate Adama Barrow, who defeated Jammeh with 43,3% of votes. However, Jammeh refused to recognise the result of the election and refused to leave office, instead proclaiming a state of emergency. Barrow abandoned the country and fled to Senegal, where he was sworn in as new president at the Gambian embassy in Dakar on 19 January 2017.

On the same day ECOWAS launched a military intervention in Gambia in order to forcefully remove Jammeh from power (Operation Restore Democracy); the move was authorized by United Nations Security Council with UNSC Resolution 2337. On 21 January 2017 Jammeh announced stepped down as president and abandoned the country and went to exile in Equatorial Guinea. On 27 January 2017 Barrow returned to Gambia and officially took office.

=== Barrow era ===
On 6 April 2017 parliamentary elections were held, which saw the victory of Barrow's United Democratic Party, scoring 37,47% and winning 31 of the 53 seats of the National Assembly.

The Gambia officially rejoined the Commonwealth on 8 February 2018.

On 4 December 2021, Gambian President Adama Barrow won re-election in the presidential election. Opposition candidates rejected the results because of unspecified irregularities.

Since Jammeh's ouster, The Gambia has undergone a significant democratic transition. Recent presidential and parliamentary elections have been regarded as competitive and fair; media freedom, academic freedom and freedom of expression all have improved significantly. The judiciary also have become more impartial and independent. To ensure justice for persecution of political opponents and dissidents during the Jammeh era, authorities establish the Truth, Reconciliation and Reparations Commission in 2018, though significant problems remained in regards to its proper functioning. Barrow initially promised to serve for only three years, but backtracked on his promise and then split from his old party and formed a new NPP party. Further controversy arose when he built a government coalition with the former-ruling APRC. As a result, widespread protests broke out and a movement called Three Years Jotna began taking shape. Their protests, initially peaceful, turned violent and authorities banned the movement.

== See also ==
- List of heads of government of the Gambia
- List of heads of state of the Gambia
- Politics of the Gambia
- Military history of the Gambia
