= Gambia Colony and Protectorate =

British colony, 1821-1965

- 1816–1965
- Flag Coat of arms
- Anthem: God Save the Queen (1837–1901; 1952–1965); God Save the King (1816–1837; 1901–1952)
- Status: Crown colony
- Capital: Bathurst
- Common languages: English (official), Mandinka, Fula, Wolof widely spoken
- Religion: Christianity, Sunni Islam, Serer
- Demonym: Gambian
- Monarch
  - 1816–1820: George III (first)
  - 1952–1965: Elizabeth II (last)
- Governor
  - 1816–1829: Sir Alexander Grant
  - 1962–1965: Sir John Paul (last)
- Prime Minister
  - 1962–1965: Dawda Jawara
- Legislature: Legislative Council (1844–1866; 1880–1960); House of Representatives (1960–1965)
- Historical era: New Imperialism
  - Establishment: 17 October 1816
  - Independence as The Gambia: 18 February 1965
- Currency: Pound sterling (to 1912); British West African pound (1912–65)
Succeeded by
The Gambia (1965–1970)
- Today part of: Gambia

The Gambia Colony and Protectorate was the British colonial administration of The Gambia from 1821 to 1965, part of the British Empire in the New Imperialism era. The colony was the immediate area surrounding Bathurst (now Banjul), and the protectorate was the inland territory situated around the Gambia River, which was declared in 1894.

== History ==
The foundation of the colony was Fort James and Bathurst, where British presence was established in 1815 and 1816, respectively. For various periods in its existence it was subordinate to the Sierra Leone Colony. However, by 1888 it was a colony in its own right with a permanently appointed Governor.

The boundaries of the territory were an issue of contention between the British and French authorities due to the proximity to French Senegal. Additionally, on numerous occasions the British government had attempted to exchange it with France for other territories, such as on the upper Niger River.

France and Britain agreed in 1889 in principle to set the boundary at 10 km (6.2 miles) north and south of the river and east to Yarbutenda, the furthest navigable point on the river Gambia. This was followed by the dispatch of a joint Anglo-French Boundary Commission to map the actual border. However, on its arrival in the area in 1891, the Boundary Commission was met with resistance by local leaders whose territories they were coming to divide. The commission could nevertheless rely on British naval power: British ships bombed the town of Kansala to force the Gambians to back off, and according to the 1906 The Gambia Colony and Protectorate: An Official Handbook, men and guns from three warships landed on the riverbanks “as a hint of what the resisters had to expect in the event of any continued resistance.”

The colony ended in 1965 when The Gambia became an independent state within the Commonwealth of Nations, with Dawda Jawara as Prime Minister.

== Economy ==
The economy of The Gambia, like other African countries at the time, was very heavily oriented towards agriculture. Reliance on the groundnut became so strong that it made up almost the entirety of exports, making the economy vulnerable. Groundnuts were the only commodity subject to export duties; these export duties resulted in the illegal smuggling of the product to French Senegal.

Attempts were made to increase production of other goods for export: the Gambian Poultry Scheme pioneered by the Colonial Development Corporation aimed to produce twenty million eggs and one million lb of dressed poultry a year. The conditions in The Gambia proved unfavourable and typhoid killed much of the chicken stock, drawing criticism to the corporation.

=== Transport ===
The River Gambia was the principal route of navigation and transport inland, with a port at Bathurst. The road network was mainly concentrated around Bathurst, with the remaining areas largely connected by dirt roads.

The only airport was at Yundum, built in World War II. In the immediate post-war era it was used for passenger flights. Both British South American Airways and the British Overseas Airways Corporation had services, the former moving its service to Dakar, which had a concrete runway (as opposed to pierced steel planking). The airport was rebuilt in 1963 and the building is still in use today.

== Government structure ==
During the later colonial period, especially in post-1901, The Gambia began to have a more developed colonial government. Roles in the government, though taken by white British officials, included examples such as the Attorney General, the Senior Medical Officer, the Controller of Customs, the Receiver General, and the Director of Public Works.

The colony was governed by the Executive Council primarily, but legislation came from the Legislative Council.

In 1919 the colony was hit by a scandal when it became known that Travelling Commission J K McCallum had passed his colonial administrative authority over to his common-law wife, Fatou Khan, who was an illiterate Wolof woman.

== Independence ==
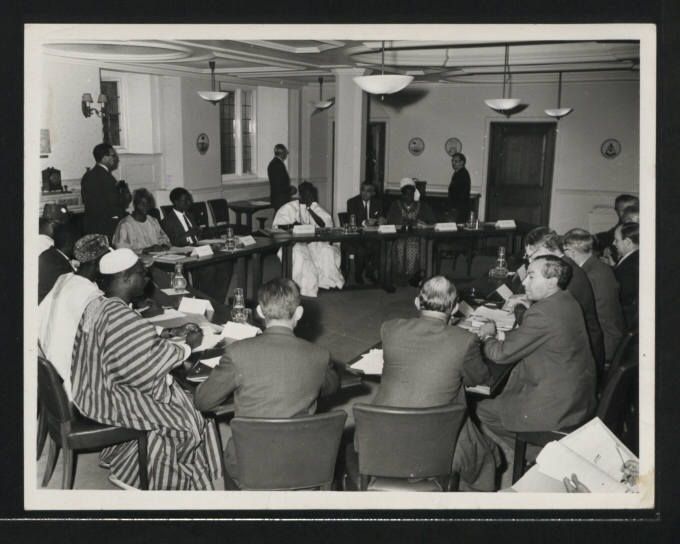
Meeting of the Gambia Constitutional Conference in London, July 1961.

In anticipation of independence, efforts were made to create internal self-government. The 1960 Constitution created a partly elected House of Representatives, with 19 elected members and 8 chosen by the chiefs. This constitution proved flawed in the 1960 elections when the two major parties tied with 8 seats each. With the support of the unelected chiefs, Pierra Sarr N'Jie of the United Party was appointed Chief Minister. Dawda Jawara of the People's Progressive Party resigned as Minister of Education, triggering a Constitutional Conference arranged by the Secretary of State for the Colonies.

The Constitutional Conference paved the way for a new constitution that granted a greater degree of self-government and a House of Representatives with more elected members. Elections were held in 1962, with Jawara's Progressive Party securing a majority of the elected seats. Under the new constitutional arrangements, Jawara was appointed prime minister: a position he held until it was abolished in 1970.

Following agreements between the British and Gambian governments in July 1964, The Gambia became independent on 18 February 1965.

== See also ==
- British West Africa
- History of the Gambia
