= Lucretia St. Clair Joof =

Gambian politician (1913–1982)

Member of the House of Representatives of the Gambia
- In office 1968–1977
- President: Dawda Jawara

Personal details
- Born: 1913 Bathurst, Gambia Colony and Protectorate
- Died: August 1982 (aged 68–69) The Gambia
- Occupation: Teacher

Lucretia St. Clair Joof (born 1913 in Bathurst, died August 1982) was the first female member of House of Representatives of the Gambia, She died in August 1982.

== Career ==
Lucretia St. Clair Joof was the first Gambian female member of the legislature. St. Clair Joof was a secondary school teacher in the early 1930s, later working as a clerk at a French retailer.

St. Clair Joof had worked as a council member of the Bathurst City Council (BCC) since 1964, and was nominated again in that capacity in January 1968. Additionally she served as chairman of the Parks and Recreational Committee and was responsible for the construction of the playground on the MacCarthy Square and the King George V Memorial Park.

After a bill to increase the number of nominated seats in the House of Representatives from two to four was passed in August 1968, President Dawda Jawara nominated her as a member. She left Parliament in 1977, but continued to serve on the city council.

== Private life ==
Lucretia St. Clair Joof was first married to lawyer Tom Taylor. After his death she married in 1941 the lawyer and politician George St. Clair Joof, who died in 1955.
