= Yaya Ceesay =

Gambian politician (1937–2026)

Minister of Agriculture and Natural Resources
- In office 1968–1969
- Prime Minister: Dawda Jawara
- Preceded by: Amang S. Kanyi
- Succeeded by: Howsoon O. Semega-Janneh
- In office 1974–1978
- President: Dawda Jawara
- Preceded by: Jerreh Daffeh
- Succeeded by: Seni Singhateh

Member of the House of Representatives of the Gambia
- In office 1960–1994

Personal details
- Born: 1937 Sankwia, Gambia Colony and Protectorate
- Died: 2 May 2026 (aged 88–89) Kanifing, The Gambia
- Party: PPP
- Occupation: Police officer

Yaya Ceesay (1937 – 2 May 2026) was a Gambian politician. A member of the People's Progressive Party, he served as Minister of Agriculture and Natural Resources from 1968 to 1969 and again from 1974 to 1978 and was a member of the House of Representatives from 1960 to 1994.

Ceesay died in Kanifing on 2 May 2026.
