= List of heads of state of the Gambia =

This is a list of the heads of state of The Gambia, from the independence of The Gambia in 1965 to the present day.

From 1965 to 1970 the head of state under the Constitution of 1965 was the queen of the Gambia, Elizabeth II, who was also the monarch of other Commonwealth realms. The monarch was represented in the Gambia by a governor-general. The Gambia became a republic within the Commonwealth under the Constitution of 1970 and the monarch and governor-general were replaced by an executive president.

== Monarch (1965–1970) ==
The succession to the throne was the same as the succession to the British throne.

No.	Portrait	Name (Birth–Death)	Reign			Royal House	Prime minister(s)
No.	Portrait	Name (Birth–Death)	Reign start	Reign end	Duration	Royal House	Prime minister(s)
1		Queen Elizabeth II (1926–2022)	18 February 1965	24 April 1970	5 years, 65 days	Windsor	Jawara

=== Governor-general ===
The governor-general was the representative of the monarch in the Gambia and exercised most of the powers of the monarch. The governor-general was appointed for an indefinite term, serving at the pleasure of the monarch. Since the Gambia was granted independence by the Gambia Independence Act 1964, rather than being first established as a semi-autonomous dominion and later promoted to independence as defined by the Statute of Westminster 1931, the governor-general was to be always appointed solely on the advice of the Cabinet of the Gambia without the involvement of the British government, with the sole exception of John Paul, the former colonial governor, who served as governor-general temporarily until he was replaced by Farimang Mamadi Singateh. In the event of a vacancy the chief justice would have served as the officer administering the government.

No.	Portrait	Name (Birth–Death)	Term of office			Monarch	Prime minister(s)
No.	Portrait	Name (Birth–Death)	Took office	Left office	Time in office	Monarch	Prime minister(s)
1		Sir John Paul (1916–2004)	18 February 1965	9 February 1966	356 days	Elizabeth II	Jawara
2		Sir Farimang Singateh (1912–1977)	9 February 1966	24 April 1970	4 years, 74 days	Elizabeth II	Jawara

== Republic (1970–present) ==
Political parties

People's Progressive Party (PPP)
Alliance for Patriotic Reorientation and Construction (APRC)
National People's Party (NPP)

Other factions

Military
Independent

=== First Republic (1970–1994) ===
Under the Constitution of 1970, the first constitution of the Republic of the Gambia, the president replaced the monarch as executive head of state. The president was elected by the National Assembly for a five-year term. In the event of a vacancy the vice-president served as acting president.

No.	Portrait	Name (Birth–Death)	Elected	Term of office			Political party
No.	Portrait	Name (Birth–Death)	Elected	Took office	Left office	Time in office	Political party
1		Sir Dawda Jawara (1924–2019)	1972; 1977; 1982; 1987; 1992	24 April 1970	22 July 1994 (Deposed in a coup)	24 years, 89 days	PPP

=== Military rule (1994–1996) ===
Colonel Yahya Jammeh led a coup d'état which overthrew President Jawara and his government, all political parties and Parliament were dissolved.

No.	Portrait	Name (Birth–Death)	Term of office			Political party
No.	Portrait	Name (Birth–Death)	Took office	Left office	Time in office	Political party
2		Colonel Yahya Jammeh (born 1965); Chairman of the AFPRC	22 July 1994	6 November 1996	2 years, 107 days	Military

=== Second Republic (1996–present) ===
Under the current constitution of the Republic of The Gambia, the president is executive head of state. The president is elected by popular vote for a five-year term. In the event of a vacancy, the vice-president will serve as acting president.

No.	Portrait	Name (Birth–Death)	Elected	Term of office			Political party
No.	Portrait	Name (Birth–Death)	Elected	Took office	Left office	Time in office	Political party
(2)		Yahya Jammeh (born 1965)	1996; 2001; 2006; 2011	6 November 1996	21 January 2017 (Note: Jammeh's presidential term was originally scheduled to end on 19 January 2017. However, in a widely disputed move amidst a constitutional crisis, the National Assembly extended his term for three months and he refused to relinquish power until 21 January, when he was forced to step down after the ECOWAS military intervention. Adama Barrow nevertheless took his oath at the Gambian Embassy in Senegal on 19 January, as scheduled, after which much of the international community recognised him as the legitimate President.)	20 years, 76 days	APRC
3		Adama Barrow (born 1965)	2016; 2021	19 January 2017 (Note: Barrow was inaugurated on 19 January 2017 at the Gambian embassy in Senegal, but Yahya Jammeh did not relinquish his position until 21 January. Barrow returned to Gambia on 26 January and took the oath of office a second time on 18 February.)	Incumbent	9 years, 217 days	Coalition 2016 (until 2019)
3		Adama Barrow (born 1965)	2016; 2021	19 January 2017	Incumbent	9 years, 217 days	NPP

== Standards ==
Governor-General's standard

Presidential standard

== See also ==
- History of the Gambia
- Politics of the Gambia
- List of colonial governors of the Gambia
- Prime Minister of the Gambia
