= Edward Windley =

British colonial administrator

Sir Edward Windley KCVO KCMG

Governor of the Gambia
- In office 12 June 1958 – 29 March 1962
- Monarch: Elizabeth II
- Preceded by: Percy Wyn-Harris
- Succeeded by: John Paul

Personal details
- Born: Sir Edward Henry Windley; 10 March 1909
- Died: 5 January 1972 (aged 62) Brisbane, Queensland, Australia
- Cause of death: Aeroplane accident
- Education: St Catharine's College, Cambridge

Sir Edward Henry Windley KCVO KCMG (10 March 1909 – 5 January 1972) was a British colonial administrator who served as the second-to-last Governor of the Gambia, from 1958 to 1962, before it achieved independence from the United Kingdom.

== Early life and family ==
Windley was born in 1909, the son of Edward Crosland Windley and Florence de Toustain, Vicomtesse de Toustain. He was educated at Repton School and studied at St Catharine's College, Cambridge from 1927 to 1930.

Windley married Patience Ann Sergison-Brooke, the daughter of Sir Bertram Sergison-Brooke and Prudence Sergison, on 29 March 1939. They had a daughter, Davina, who married George Dawson-Damer, 7th Earl of Portarlington.

== Career ==
Much of Windley's early career was spent as an administrator in Kenya. He was appointed as a district officer of Narok District on 9 December 1936 and then as a district officer of Masai District, based in Kajiado, on 27 February 1938. He became the District Commissioner in Narok on 27 February 1945. On 30 January 1948, he was promoted to Deputy Provincial Commissioner of the Central Province in Kenya, serving under Aubrey Mullins. On 15 April 1948, he was appointed as Acting Provincial Commissioner of the Central Province, and on 18 October 1949, he was promoted to full Provincial Commissioner of Central Province. Windley went on leave in 1954 and returned on 15 January 1955 to serve as Chief Native Commissioner and Minister for African Affairs.

He served as Governor of the Gambia from 12 June 1958 to 29 March 1962. On 29 September 1959, a revised constitution drawn up by Windley was published. It established the House of Representatives of the Gambia, to replace the Legislative Council. One of his aims as Governor was to encourage a union between the Gambia and the neighbouring French colony of Senegal, which achieved independence in 1960. Following the 1960 election, Windley made the controversial decision to appoint Pierre Sarr N'Jie as the first Chief Minister of the Gambia despite the United Party not holding a majority in the House.

For his services, he was made a Knight Commander of the Royal Victorian Order (KCVO) and a Knight Commander of the Order of St Michael and St George (KCMG). He retired from the civil service in 1962 after his time in the Gambia ended.

== Death ==
He died in an aeroplane accident at Brisbane, Australia, in January 1972.
