= Democratic Congress Alliance =

Political alliance in the Gambia

The Democratic Congress Alliance (DCA) was a political alliance in the Gambia. It was formed in the run-up to the 1960 general elections by the Democratic Party and the Muslim Congress Party.

The Democratic Party (representing Christian communities) and the Muslim Congress (representing Muslim communities) had been contesting for influence in urban communities. But eventually the two rivals united in order to counter the growing influence of the United Party. The Democratic and Muslim Congress parties began holding joint meetings in September 1959, and on 7 April 1960 they announced the formation of a 'non-sectarian alliance'. The main leaders of the party were I.M. Garba-Jahumpa (Secretary General) and J.C. Faye. African Unity was the party newspaper.

The DCA fielded candidates in all five Bathurst constituencies in the 1960 elections, winning three seats. In the 1962 elections the alliance won only one seat, but was still invited to join Dawda Jawara's government. For the 1966 elections it formed an alliance with the United Party, which won eight seats, but afterwards disappeared.
