= Andrew Barkworth Wright =

Sir Andrew Barkworth Wright KCMG CBE MC with Bar

Governor of British Cyprus
- In office 4 August 1949 – 9 February 1954
- Monarchs: George VI; Elizabeth II
- Preceded by: Reginald Fletcher, 1st Baron Winster
- Succeeded by: Robert Perceval Armitage

Governor of the Gambia
- In office 29 March 1947 – 1 December 1949
- Monarch: George VI
- Preceded by: Hilary Blood
- Succeeded by: Percy Wyn-Harris

Colonial Secretary of Trinidad
- In office 1943–1947

Personal details
- Born: 30 November 1895
- Died: 24 March 1971 (aged 75)
- Education: Jesus College, Cambridge

Sir Andrew Barkworth Wright KCMG CBE MC with Bar (30 November 1895 – 24 March 1971) was a British colonial administrator and army officer. He served as the Governor of British Cyprus from 1949 to 1954 and as Governor of the Gambia from 1947 to 1949.

== Early life and education ==
Wright was born in Mawgan-in-Meneage, Cornwall, the son of an Anglican clergyman. His heritage has been traced back to John I'Anson (1467–1546), who migrated from Belgium to Cumbria. He was educated at Haileybury and Imperial Service College from 1910 to 1914 and later at Jesus College, Cambridge. He served as an officer in the Suffolk Regiment during World War I and won the Military Cross (MC) in 1917.

== Colonial service ==
Wright joined the civil service in British Cyprus in 1922 and, by 1937, had become its Colonial Secretary. He re-enlisted in the army during World War II but left in 1943 at the rank of Lieutenant Colonel to become Colonial Secretary of Trinidad. In January 1947, he was appointed Governor of the Gambia, and in 1948, he was knighted. During his tenure as Governor, the Colonial Development Corporation implemented the failed Yundum egg scheme and the marginal experimental rice farm at Wallikunda.

A lack of funds stifled Wright's efforts to improve the social and economic situations. However, during his time, the first direct election to the Legislative Council was organised in 1947, and Edward Francis Small was elected. He also adopted a policy of Africanization in the civil service and sought to reduce European privilege, for instance, by opening up the 'European block' at the Royal Victoria Hospital. In May 1949, it was announced that Wright would be transferred to Cyprus, where there was a deteriorating political situation. Due to his popularity in the Gambia, this sparked large-scale protests in Bathurst, led by Small and J. C. Faye.

During his time as Governor of British Cyprus, 96% of Greek Cypriots voted for a union with Greece in 1950. Wright retired from colonial service in 1953. He died in Lewknor, Oxfordshire, on 24 March 1971.
