= Pierre Sarr N'Jie =

Gambian politician

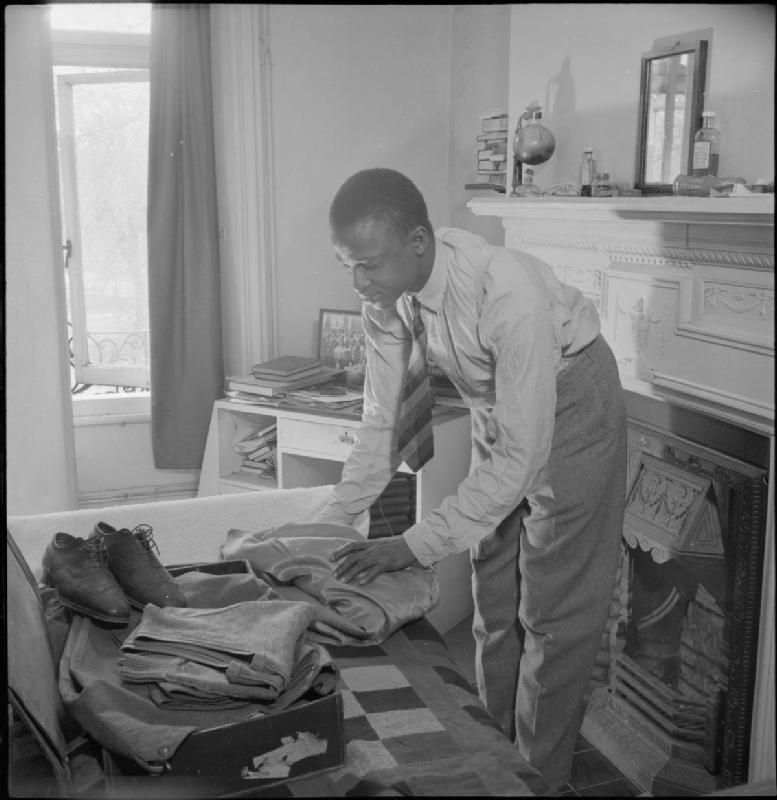
- N'Jie at the Colonial Centre, London, while a law student in 1944.

Chief Minister of the Gambia
- In office 14 March 1961 – 12 June 1962
- Governor: Edward Henry Windley
- Preceded by: New position
- Succeeded by: Dawda Jawara (as Prime Minister)

Leader of the Opposition
- In office 1962–1972
- President: Dawda Jawara

Minister for Education and Social Welfare
- In office 1954 – January 1956
- Governor: Percy Wyn-Harris

Leader of the United Party
- In office 1952–1977

Member of the House of Representatives
- In office 1966 – 1 July 1972
- Constituency: Bathurst North
- In office 1960–1966
- Constituency: New Town East

Member of the Legislative Council from Bathurst
- In office 1954–1960

Personal details
- Born: 17 July 1909 Bathurst, British Gambia
- Died: 11 December 1993 (aged 84)
- Party: United Party
- Education: King's College London; Lincoln's Inn

Pierre Sarr N'Jie (17 July 1909 – 11 December 1993) was a Gambian lawyer and politician who served as the Chief Minister of the Gambia from 1961 to 1962. He was the country's first head of government following the declaration of self-rule in 1961. From 1952 until 1977, he was leader of the United Party. He was also a member of the House of Representatives from 1960 to 1972, and de facto Leader of the Opposition for a period, opposite Dawda Jawara.

== Early life and government employment ==
N'Jie was born in the Gambia in 1909 to a Wolof Muslim family. His father was a trader who was the nephew of one of the last kings of Saloum, Semu Joof. Thus, through his father, he had Serer blood from the Joof family of Saloum. N'Jie attended Saint Augustine's School in Bathurst and taught there before entering government employment in January 1929. He entered the Judicial Department as an assistant clerk of the courts in 1931, remaining there until July 1943 when he retired on a pension on medical grounds. In February 1943, he had been arrested and prosecuted on the charge of forging the signature of a plaintiff in a civil case. After the short trial, N'Jie was acquitted by the local magistrates due to a lack of evidence but was not given his old job back. The government later refused to pay him any health or reputational compensation, which he greatly resented.

== Studies in England and legal career ==
Having failed to secure alternative employment in the Gambia, he left for the United Kingdom to study medicine at King's College London. However, he said "I only stayed there a short time. I was to be a doctor, but I don't like blood." In September 1943, he began legal training at Lincoln's Inn, one of the Inns of Court. In 1948, he became the first Wolof to be called to the bar. He returned to the Gambia in 1949 to set up his own firm in Bathurst. His main success was in conveyancing land between Africans and Lebanese. In September 1958, the deputy judge of the Supreme Court of the Gambia, Myles John Abbott, disbarred N'Jie from the legal profession for one of these deals. This decision was set aside by the West African Court of Appeal in June 1959, on the grounds that a deputy judge had no jurisdiction in the matter. In May 1961, the Judicial Committee of the Privy Council ruled that the deputy judge's initial decision should be upheld in a case known as The Attorney-General of the Gambia vs Pierre Sarr N'Jie.

== Political career ==
N'Jie first stood for election in the Legislative Council in 1951 but was not elected. He stood again in 1954, supported by his recently established United Party. He had greater financial resources at his disposal than his opponent and had the advantage of not being associated with the unpopular incumbent Governor of the Gambia, Percy Wyn-Harris. He also enjoyed support from female voters who were organised by his sister, Yadicone N'Jie. N'Jie won the election and was also appointed to the Executive Council as Minister for Education and Social Welfare. However, in October 1955, following a clash between United Party supporters and Gambia Muslim Congress supporters in Bathurst, N'Jie accused the Chief Superintendent of Police of not taking enough action to prevent the violence and suppressing possible prosecutions. A subsequent commission of inquiry failed to support his accusation and strongly criticised his conduct. Wyn-Harris instructed N'Jie to resign from the Executive Council, and when he refused, he was dismissed in January 1956.

In the first election to the House of Representatives in 1960, N'Jie was elected as the member for New Town East. However, it was the People's Progressive Party (PPP) that won the largest number of seats. Governor Edward Windley offered N'Jie a Minister without Portfolio position on the Executive Council, which he immediately rejected, putting the United Party into opposition. Therefore, it was a surprise when Windley appointed N'jie as the first Chief Minister of the Gambia in March 1961. He believed that the United Party was actually gaining popular support over the PPP, and also that he would have influence over M. E. Jallow, the leader of the Gambia Workers' Union.

During his term as Chief Minister, N'Jie was involved in early negotiations with the Senegalese government over the Gambia's long-term future. He remained as Chief Minister until the 1962 election, when the PPP won a clear victory, although N'Jie retained his New Town East seat. N'Jie became the Leader of the Opposition, while Dawda Jawara became the first Prime Minister of the Gambia. The United Party challenged the election results in the courts, alleging that the register of voters had been invalid. The claim was upheld by the West African Court of Appeal in April 1963, but N'Jie dedicated much of his time until Gambian independence trying to persuade the British government to call a new election. In his absence, the United Party went into decline, with a number of its members joining the PPP.

Returning to work in the Gambia in January 1965, N'Jie successfully organised the 'no' vote in the 1965 republic referendum but failed to repeat this success in the 1966 election. Although he won his own seat of Bathurst North, he did not prevent a PPP victory. N'Jie's popularity waned into the late 1960s, and shortly after the 1970 republic referendum, a result he refused to success, on 8 May he was dismissed as the leader by his party's executive committee. He was replaced by his brother, E. D. N'Jie, but after his death on 19 October, the United Party was obliged to reinstate N'Jie. He failed to provide inspiring leadership, and despite winning his own seat again in 1972, only two other United Party members were elected besides him. He was expelled from the House of Representatives in 1972 for nonattendance of two consecutive meetings. Despite remaining party leader, he took little more part in political life, and by 1977 seldom ventured out of his home. He died at the age of 84 on 11 December 1993.

== Personal life ==
N'Jie converted to Catholicism in 1939.
