= Percy Wyn-Harris =

English mountaineer, colonial administrator and yachtsman

Sir Percy Wyn-Harris KCMG MBE KStJ
- Wyn-Harris in 1959

Administrator of the Northern Cameroons
- In office October 1960 – 1 June 1961
- Monarch: Elizabeth II
- Succeeded by: Position abolished

Governor of the Gambia
- In office 1 December 1949 – 19 June 1958
- Monarchs: George VI; Elizabeth II
- Preceded by: Andrew Barkworth Wright
- Succeeded by: Edward Henry Windley

Personal details
- Born: 24 August 1903 Acton, Middlesex, England
- Died: 25 February 1979 (aged 75) Petersfield, Hampshire, England
- Education: Gonville and Caius College, Cambridge

Sir Percy Wyn-Harris KCMG MBE KStJ (24 August 1903 – 25 February 1979) was an English mountaineer, colonial administrator, and yachtsman. He worked in the Colonial Service in Africa and served as Governor of the Gambia from 1949 to 1958.

== Early life and mountaineering ==
Wyn-Harris was born in Acton, Middlesex on 24 August 1903 as Percy Wynne Harris (he formally changed his name to Percy Wyn-Harris in 1953). He was the son of a company director and was educated at Gresham's School, Holt, and Gonville and Caius College, Cambridge. As an undergraduate, he was a member of the University Mountaineering Club. In 1925, he made the first ascent without guides of the Brouillard Ridge on Mont Blanc.

In 1929, he met mountaineer Eric Shipton and together they climbed the twin peaks of Mount Kenya, making the first ascent of Nelion, the secondary summit. A member of Hugh Ruttledge's 1933 Mount Everest expedition, Wyn-Harris reached Edward Norton's record height of 8,573 m (28,126 feet). At around 8,460 m (27,920 ft), he discovered an ice axe, which was almost certainly a remnant of Mallory and Irvine's ill-fated attempt at the first ascent in 1924. Wyn-Harris returned to Everest in 1936, in an expedition again led by Hugh Ruttledge.

== Colonial Service ==
=== Kenya ===
Wyn-Harris joined the Colonial Service in Kenya in 1926. Beginning as a district officer, in 1939 to 1940 he served as Settlement Officer for Kikuyu land claims. He was the District Commissioner of Nyeri from 1941 to 1943, Labour Liaison Officer from 1943 to 1944, and Labour Commissioner from 1944 to 1945. He became Provincial Commissioner of the Central Province in 1946, serving for a year, then in 1947 Chief Native Commissioner and Minister for African Affairs, serving in this role until 1949. Lewis (2000) claims that in his time in Kenya Wyn-Harris viewed it as "overpopulated and desperately needing urbanization, birth control, and secondary industries."

=== The Gambia ===
Wyn-Harris was appointed as Governor of the Gambia in December 1949. His time in office coincided with a growth of nationalist sentiment in West Africa. It was his belief that the Gambia should not progress towards self-government; rather, it should maintain a permanent link with the United Kingdom and be administered locally: what he termed the 'Channel Islands option'. Wyn-Harris was also opposed to the development of political parties in the Gambia. His first constitution in 1951 increased the number of elected members of the Legislative Council from two to three. After the 1951 election, he also put up the number of unofficial members of the Executive Council and did so again with his 1953 constitution. Two of these members were granted specific portfolios and termed Ministers.

Despite these reforms, Wyn-Harris was not popular among the people of Bathurst, particularly after he dismissed P. S. N'Jie from the Executive Council in January 1956. However, he was more popular in the Protectorate, having undertaken a determined effort to improve conditions there. Wyn-Harris left the Gambia in April 1958, having so upset the Bathurst population that he departed by slipping across the border into Senegal, rather than bowing out in a public ceremony. After his time in the Gambia, he was a member of the Devlin Commission of Enquiry into the Nyasaland disturbances of 1959 and served as the Administrator of the North Cameroons from October 1960 to June 1961. The North Cameroons was a region of Nigeria that had been a League of Nations mandate and had become a United Nations Trust Territory overseen by the United Kingdom. A United Nations plebiscite on the region's future conducted during his tenure resulted in the region formally becoming part of Nigeria at the end of May 1961.

== Retirement and death ==
Between 1962 and 1969, Wyn-Harris circumnavigated the globe in his sloop Spurwing, a Gunning Grundel. He died in Petersfield, Hampshire, aged 75.

== Honours ==
- 1941: Member of the Order of the British Empire (MBE)
- 1949: Companion of the Order of St Michael and St George (CMG)
- 1950: Knight of the Order of St John (KStJ)
- 1952: Knight Commander of the Order of St Michael and St George (KCMG)

Government offices
Preceded by Sir Andrew Barkworth Wright	Governor of The Gambia; 1949–1958	Succeeded by Sir Edward Henry Windley
