= Barajally =

- Village
- Location in the Gambia
- Coordinates: 13°35′55″N 14°56′51″W
- Country: Gambia
- Division: Central River Division
- District: Niani
- Elevation: 40 ft (12 m)

Population (2008)
  - Total: 878
- Time zone: UTC+00:00 (GMT)

Barajally is a small village in central Gambia. It is located in Niani District in the Central River Division. As of 2008, it has an estimated population of 878.

It is the birthplace of President Dawda Jawara.
