= 1982 Gambian general election =

- 4 and 5 May 1982
- Presidential election
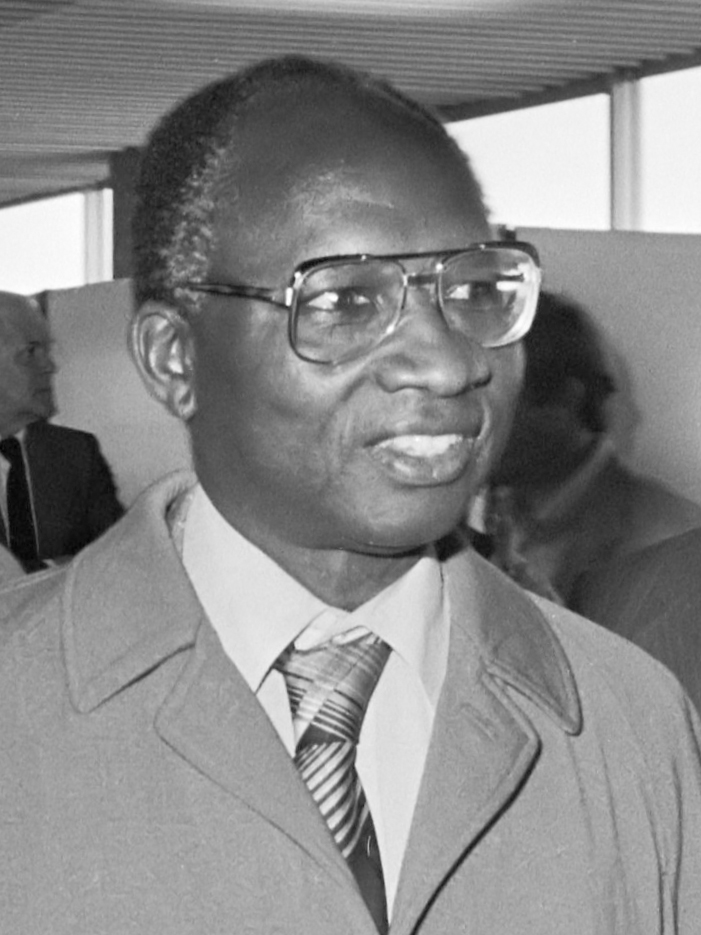

Nominee	Sir Dawda Jawara	Sheriff Dibba
Party	PPP	NCP
Popular vote	137,020	52,136
Percentage	72.44%	27.56%
- Results by region
President before election
Sir Dawda Jawara
PPP
Elected President
Sir Dawda Jawara
PPP

General elections were held in the Gambia on 4 and 5 May 1982. Following a constitutional amendment in March 1982, for the first time the President was elected by a popular vote alongside the National Assembly. Both elections were won by the People's Progressive Party, whose leader Sir Dawda Jawara remained as the first president of The Gambia.

== Results ==
=== President ===
Candidate	Party	Votes	%
Sir Dawda Jawara	People's Progressive Party	137,020	72.44
Sheriff Mustapha Dibba	National Convention Party	52,136	27.56
Total		189,156	100.00
Source: Inter-Parliamentary Union

=== National Assembly ===
Party	Votes	%	Seats	+/–
People's Progressive Party	102,545	61.74	27	–2
National Convention Party	32,634	19.65	3	–2
United Party	4,782	2.88	0	–1
Independents	26,141	15.74	5	+5
Presidential appointees			8	+4
Paramount chiefs' representatives			5	+1
Attorney General of the Gambia (ex officio)			1	0
Total	166,102	100.00	49	+5
Source: Inter-Parliamentary Union
