= Prime Minister of the Gambia =

1961–1970 head of government of The Gambia

Prime Minister of The Gambia
- Coat of arms
- Formation: 14 March 1961
- First holder: Pierre Sarr N'Jie
- Final holder: Dawda Jawara
- Abolished: 24 April 1970
- Succession: President of the Gambia

The prime minister of the Gambia, known as the chief minister from 1961–1962, was the head of government in the Gambia Colony and Protectorate, and later the Gambia, from 1961 to 1970. The position was only held by two people, Pierre Sarr N'Jie and Dawda Jawara.

== List of officeholders ==
Political parties

United Party (PP)
People's Progressive Party (PPP)

No.	Portrait	Name (Birth–Death)	Elected	Term of office			Political party
No.	Portrait	Name (Birth–Death)	Elected	Took office	Left office	Time in office	Political party
Gambia Colony and Protectorate (1961–1965)
1		Pierre Sarr N'Jie (1909–1993)	1960	14 March 1961	12 June 1962	1 year, 90 days	UP
2		Dawda Jawara (1924–2019)	1962	12 June 1962	18 February 1965	2 years, 249 days	PPP
The Gambia (1965–1970)
2		Dawda Jawara (1924–2019)	1966	18 February 1965	24 April 1970	5 years, 62 days	PPP

== See also ==
- List of colonial governors of the Gambia
- List of heads of state of the Gambia
- Lists of office-holders
