= 1972 Gambian general election =

General elections were held in the Gambia on 28 and 29 March 1972. They were won by the ruling party, the People's Progressive Party, which took 28 of the 32 elected seats (including five in which its candidates were unopposed).

== Results ==
| Party | Votes | % | Seats | +/– |
|---|---|---|---|---|
| People's Progressive Party | 65,388 | 62.96 | 28 | +4 |
| United Party | 17,161 | 16.52 | 3 | –1 |
| Independents | 21,302 | 20.51 | 1 | +1 |
| Paramount chiefs' representatives | | | 4 | – |
| Presidential appointees | | | 3 | – |
| Attorney General (ex officio) | | | 1 | – |
| Total | 103,851 | 100.00 | 40 | 0 |
| Registered voters/turnout | 136,521 | – | | |
Source: African Elections Database
