= 1960 Gambian parliamentary election =

Parliamentary elections were held in the Gambia in 1960, following the implementation of a new constitution, which created a House of Representatives. The new legislature had 19 elected seats, twelve seats were elected in the protectorate and seven in the colony (Bathurst and Kombo St Mary). Eight seats were reserved for chiefs. In addition, the Governor-general, the Speaker (appointed by the governor-general after consultation with council members), the Civil Secretary, the Financial Secretary, the Attorney General and the Commissioner for Local Government and up to three nominated members were also members of the House.

The People's Progressive Party won nine of the 19 elected seats. However, United Party leader Pierre Sarr N'Jie became the country's first Chief Minister in March the following year, appointed by Governor-general Edward Windley after a majority of the eight chiefs supported him.

== Results ==
Party	Votes	%	Seats
People's Progressive Party	25,490	36.92	9
United Party	12,497	18.10	5
Democratic Congress Alliance	3,526	5.11	1
Independents	27,535	39.88	4
Seats reserved for Chiefs			8
Total	69,048	100.00	27
Source: African Elections Database
