= 1977 Gambian general election =

General elections were held in the Gambia on 4 and 5 April 1977. They were won by the ruling People's Progressive Party, which claimed 29 of the 35 elected seats. There were 216,234 registered voters.

== Results ==
Party	Votes	%	Seats	+/–
People's Progressive Party	123,297	69.59	29	+1
National Convention Party	40,212	22.70	5	New
United Party	5,403	3.05	1	–2
National Liberation Party	4,095	2.31	0	New
Independents	4,174	2.36	0	–1
Paramount chiefs' representatives			4	0
Presidential appointees			4	+1
Attorney General (ex-officio)			1	0
Total	177,181	100.00	44	+4
Registered voters/turnout	216,234	–		
Source: Inter-Parliamentary Union
