= United Party (The Gambia) =

Political party in the Gambia

The United Party was a political party in the Gambia. The party was founded during the colonial period in the-then colony of Bathurst (today known as Banjul). The party drew support mainly from Roman Catholics. In Banjul it had support mainly amongst the Wolofs, and in the rural areas mainly amongst Fulas. The party was led by former Chief Minister Pierre Sarr N'Jie, and acted as the main opposition to the People's Progressive Party from 1962 to 1975.

In 1963, the People's Progressive Party and Democratic Congress Alliance invited the United Party to join the government. After two years, the party left the government. Its position as an opposition party would begin to decline in the following years. In 1970, the party suffered a heavy blow when its Secretary-General joined the PPP.

During the 1970s and 1980s, the party heavily opposed the Senegambia Confederation.

== Election results ==
Election	Leader	Votes	%	Seats	+/–	Position	Position
1960	Pierre Sarr N'Jie	12,497	18.1%	5 / 19	New	▲2nd	Government
1962	Pierre Sarr N'Jie	37,016	37.9%	13 / 32	▲8	2nd	Opposition
1966	Pierre Sarr N'Jie	41,549	33.4%	8 / 32	▼5	2nd	Opposition
1972	Pierre Sarr N'Jie	17,161	16.5%	3 / 32	▼4	2nd	Opposition
1977	Pierre Sarr N'Jie	5,403	3.1%	1 / 35	▼2	▼3rd	Opposition
1982		4,782	2.9%	0 / 35	▼1	3rd	Extra-parliamentary
1987		3,210	1.5%	1 / 36	▲1	▼4th	Opposition
1992		2,892	1.4%	0 / 36	▼1	▼6th	Extra-parliamentary
