= Proposed cession of the Gambia to France =

The proposed cession of The Gambia to France was a political issue in the United Kingdom in the late 19th century. It was raised in both 1870 and from 1874 to 1876. Both times it faced significant opposition from both the native population and the British merchants based in The Gambia. It was raised again in the 1890s as a possible exchange for French fishing rights off the Newfoundland coast.

== 1870 proposal ==
=== Initial suggestion and acceptance ===
In 1868, Arthur Kennedy, Governor of Sierra Leone, acknowledged an inquiry from the French regarding the possibility of the cession of the Gambia to France in return for other French territories in West Africa. In April 1869, Kennedy said that such an arrangement would have obvious commercial, administrative and military benefits. However, he warned that the native population had a "chivalrous attachment to the Queen and Her Government." He also observed that "the natives of the country would regard any negotiations [as a] sale of their country." In February 1870, the British government accepted the proposal in principle. However, it did not want any of the French settlements on offer and proposed to cede the colony in exchange for the French renouncing any claim to the disputed Mellacourie region north of Freetown. This proposal was accepted by the French in March.

=== Opposition in the Gambia ===
==== Opposition of natives ====
After news of the negotiations reached the Gambia, members of the Liberated African community in Bathurst - specifically J. D. Richards, S. J. Forster, Sr., and W. C. Walcott organised opposition to the proposals. Three petitions against cession were organised between April and October 1870. In London, Joseph Reffles condemned the idea in letters to The African Times.

==== Opinion of merchants ====
The opinions of the British merchants in the Gambia on the proposed cession was split. However, a large group of were merchants were opposed to the idea of a cession, led by Thomas Chown, whose firms was one of the oldest in Bathurst having been founded in the 1840s. Thomas Brown (1811-1881), one of the foremost merchants in the Gambia at the time, was strongly opposed to the possibility of the cession. He was the only unofficial member of the Legislative Council in 1870 when the news broke, and made his opposition clear inside and outside the council. He also persuaded the Manchester Chamber of Commerce to oppose the cession. In May 1871, he founded the Gambia's first newspaper, The Bathurst Times, to oppose the cession, although it was short-lived.

=== Parliamentary debates ===
On 15 July 1870, in the House of Lords, the Duke of Manchester put a question to the Secretary of State for the Colonies on the proposed cession. He said that the matter appeared to involve the "undue exercise of the Prerogative of the Crown." He said that it would be a breach of neutrality to hand over a "seaport of great capacity" that was "advantageously situated" to a nation that was at war with one of the UK's allies. He argued that "if the French thought it desirable to obtain it, it must be equally desirable for us to keep it." He also said that the residents of the Gambia should not be moved to the control of another power without their consent. The Duke said he understood that 600 native inhabitants of the Gambia had, "without instigation on the part of any Englishman", signed a petition that had been sent to the Colonial Office. He said that their main motivation was to avoid the country losing out on trade as a result of being under French control.

Earl Granville, who had just become Secretary of State for Foreign and Commonwealth Affairs, responded on behalf of the Colonies Secretary. He said that the matter was never going to be completed without the consent of Parliament. However, he said that "you will find it excessively difficult to show what advantage is gained by this country by retaining possession of this settlement." He said that as there was no slave trade and no suppression of the slave trade anymore, there was little value in maintaining the Gambia. He also said there was no military value to the Gambia, "unless our seamen were seized with an unusual whim to run away and hide themselves from the rest of the world." The Earl continued that in fact, trade had "steadily fallen off" and "the revenue with it". He said that Colonial Office officials tended to have difficulty adapting to conditions in the Gambia, and also that the handwriting on the petition the Duke referenced was seemingly by the same person. He concluded that "While the Colony would be of great advantage to the French in connection with their flourishing Colony of Senegal, I think it is no exaggeration to say that Gambia is to our country an absolute burden without any redeeming characteristics."

== Second proposal, 1874–76 ==
In April 1874, the French government again proposed that the Gambia should be exchanged. This time, they proposed that it would be done in return for the Ivory Coast and the Mellacourie region. Once the news broke in mid-1875, there was further opposition in Bathurst. Liberated African political leaders formed the Gambia Native Association to coordinate their proposals. Likewise, the British merchants formed the Gambia Committee, which also condemned cession. Negotiations were again delayed again, and in March 1876, when it appeared that he may have misled Parliament, the Earl of Carnarvon broke off negotiations.

In 1876, the South Australian Register concluded with the following in an article on the possible Gambian cession: "At this moment, every portion of England's vast Colonial Empire is thoroughly loyal, but it is not too much to say that very different sentiments will arise if the British Government once give their assent to the principle that to suit the fancy of statesmen any portion of the colonies may be given away to or exchange with a foreign power, not only without the consent, but contrary to the wish of the people whose allegiance is made a matter of barter."

== Collapse of the 1870s proposals ==
The idea of exchange remained a political possibility in the 1880s, but no firm proposals were put forward by either government. Concurrent with many of these events, Otto von Bismarck set about unifying the German states. During this process, he provoked the French into the Franco-Prussian War. Following the war, the French did not revisit the subject of Gambian cession, and the British authorities "apparently thought better of pursuing the matter."

== Proposal raised again, 1890s ==
There was the possibility of cession again in the 1890s as the government proposed that a West African colony, likely the Gambia, would be ceded to the French in return for them giving up their fishing rights on the Newfoundland coast. According to The New York Times, the dispute over Newfoundland fishing rights had been going on since the Treaty of Utrecht in 1713. In 1891, The Spectator noted that "British Gambia is of little use to England except as a means of inflicting injury on France, it would be not unreasonable on our part to exchange it as suggested."
