= 1966 Gambian general election =

General elections were held in the Gambia on 26 May 1966. The result was a victory for the ruling People's Progressive Party, which won 24 of the 32 elected seats. Voter turnout was 71.1%.

== Results ==
Party	Votes	%	Seats	+/–
People's Progressive Party	81,313	65.32	24	+6
United Party	21,703	17.43	4	–
Gambia Congress Party–United Party	19,846	15.94	4	–
Independents	1,630	1.31	0	0
Total	124,492	100.00	32	0
Registered voters/turnout	175,732	–		
Source: Hughes & Perfect, Sternberger et al.

Of the four seats won by the United Party-Gambia Congress Party coalition, the United Party took three and the Gambia Congress Party one.
