= House of Representatives of the Gambia =

Type
- Type: Unicameral

History
- Founded: 1960
- Disbanded: 1994
- Preceded by: Legislative Council of the Gambia
- Succeeded by: National Assembly of the Gambia

Elections
- Last election: 1992

The House of Representatives of the Gambia was the legislature of the Gambia from 1960 to 1994, succeeding the Legislative Council and being succeeded by the National Assembly.

== History ==
The House of Representatives was established by the 1959 constitution drawn up by Edward Henry Windley, then Governor of the Gambia. It came into operation for the 1960 election, replacing the Legislative Council. Initially, the House had 34 members. 27 of these were directly elected, seven were nominated, and there was also a Speaker. 19 were elected directly by universal suffrage, with a voting age of 21, and the other 8 were elected indirectly by the Conference of Protectorate Chiefs. Of the 19 directly elected members, 12 represented the Protectorate, and 7 represented the Colony constituencies.

A constitutional conference in London in July 1961 agreed to some changes to the composition of the House, that were implemented for the 1962 election. The number of directly elected members was increased from 19 to 32. The Colony's representation remained at 7, with that of the Protectorate increasing to 25. The number of chiefs was reduced to 4, and there was also one ex-officio member and two nominated members (who were not permitted to vote). Prior to the 1966 election, the number of Bathurst seats was reduced from 5 to 3, with the extra 2 seats being granted to the Provinces. The number of directly elected seats was increased to 35 in 1977 and to 36 in 1987, with all members being elected by the first past the post system.

In 1982, the number of indirectly-elected chiefs was increased by one to 5, while in 1992 there were 8 nominated members, representing special interest groups such as women, business and trade unions. Initially, the House met 3 or 4 times a year, but by the 1990s this was up to 8 times a year, with sittings lasting for up to 8 days. Following the 1994 coup d'état, the House of Representatives was abolished and was replaced by the National Assembly in 1997.

== Political composition ==
Throughout its lifetime, the House was dominated by MPs of the People's Progressive Party, which was also the party of the President, Dawda Jawara.
