= 1962 Gambian parliamentary election =

Parliamentary elections were held in the Gambia between 22 and 31 May 1962. The result was a victory for the People's Progressive Party, which won 18 of the 32 elected seats. A further eight members were appointed by the Governor-general and protectorate chiefs.

== Results ==
Party	Votes	%	Seats	+/–
People's Progressive Party	56,343	57.70	18	+9
United Party	37,016	37.91	13	+8
Democratic Congress Alliance	4,180	4.28	1	0
Independents	108	0.11	0	–4
Appointees			8	0
Total	97,647	100.00	40	+13
Source: African Elections Database
