= Dawda Jawara =

First president of the Gambia from 1970 to 1994

Sir Dawda Jawara GCMG
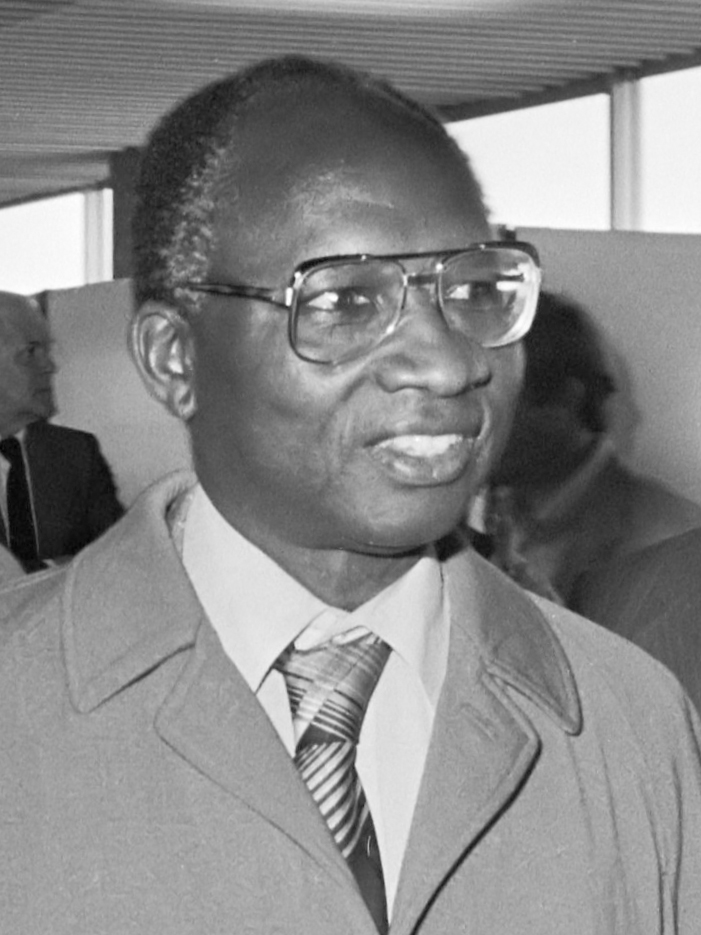
- Jawara in 1979

1st President of the Gambia
- In office 24 April 1970 – 22 July 1994
- Vice President: Sheriff Mustapha Dibba; Assan Musa Camara; Alhajie Alieu Badara Njie; Bakary Bunja Darbo; Saihou Sabally
- Preceded by: Elizabeth II as Queen of the Gambia
- Succeeded by: Yahya Jammeh

Vice President of Senegambia
- In office 12 December 1981 – 30 September 1989
- President: Abdou Diouf

Prime Minister of the Gambia
- In office 12 June 1962 – 24 April 1970
- Monarch: Elizabeth II
- Governors General: Sir John Paul; Sir Farimang Singhateh
- Governor: Sir John Paul (1962–1965)
- Preceded by: Pierre Sarr N'Jie
- Succeeded by: Office abolished

Personal details
- Born: Dawda Kairaba Jawara; 16 May 1924 Barajally, MacCarthy Island Division, British Gambia
- Died: 27 August 2019 (aged 95) Fajara, Bakau, The Gambia
- Party: People’s Progressive Party (PPP)
- Spouses: Augusta Mahoney (m. 1955; div. 1967) Chilel N'Jie (m. 1968) Njaimeh M'Boge (m. 1970)
- Children: Bolumbo Jawara
- Education: University of Glasgow; University of Liverpool; University of Edinburgh

Sir Dawda Kairaba Jawara GCMG (16 May 1924 – 27 August 2019) was a Gambian politician who served as prime minister from 1962 to 1970, and then as the first President of The Gambia from 1970 to 1994, when he was overthrown by Yahya Jammeh.

Jawara was born in Barajally, MacCarthy Island Division, now the Central River Region. He was the son of Mamma Fatty and Almami Jawara. He was educated at the Methodist Boys' School in Banjul (Bathurst) and then attended Achimota College in the Gold Coast (now Ghana). He trained as a veterinary surgeon at the University of Glasgow's School of Veterinary Medicine, then completed his training at the University of Liverpool and the University of Edinburgh. He returned to The Gambia in 1953 and married Augusta Mahoney, beginning work as a veterinary officer. He entered politics and became secretary of the new People's Progressive Party (PPP) and was elected to the House of Representatives at the 1960 election. He became the leader of the PPP and then the country's first prime minister in 1962, only the second-ever head of government following Pierre Sarr N'Jie's term as Chief Minister.

Under Jawara, The Gambia gained independence from the United Kingdom in 1965. He remained as prime minister and Elizabeth II remained as head of state as Queen of The Gambia. In 1970, The Gambia became a republic, and Jawara was elected as its first president. The greatest challenge to Jawara's power came in 1981 when an attempted coup d'état took place and soldiers from neighbouring Senegal were forced to intervene, with 400 to 800 deaths reported by the end of the coup attempt. Following the coup attempt, Jawara and Senegalese President Abdou Diouf announced the creation of the Senegambia Confederation, but it proved to be short-lived and ultimately collapsed eight years later in 1989.

Jawara continued to rule until 1994 when a coup d'état led by Yahya Jammeh seized power. Following this, he went into exile, but returned in 2002, and lived in retirement in The Gambia until his death in 2019.

== Childhood and early education ==
Dawda Jawara was born in 1924 to Almammi Jawara and Mamma Fatty in the village of Barajally Tenda in the central river region of The Gambia, approximately 240 kilometres (150 mi) from the capital, Banjul, then called Bathurst. One of six sons, Dawda was the last born on his mother's side and a younger brother to sister Na Ceesay and brothers Basaddi and Sheriffo Jawara.

Their father Almammi, who had several wives, was a well-to-do trader from an aristocratic family who commuted from Barajally Tenda to his trading post in Wally Kunda.

Dawda from an early age attended the local Arabic schools to memorize the Quran, a rite of passage for many Gambian children. There were no primary schools in Barajally Tenda: the nearest was in Georgetown (Janjanbureh), the provincial capital, but this boarding school was reserved for the sons of the chiefs.

Around 1933, young Jawara's formal education was sponsored by a friend of his father, a trader named Ebrima Youma Jallow, whose trading post was across the street from Alammi's in Wally-Kunda. Dawda was enrolled at Mohammedan primary school where he was taught by I.M. Garba-Jahumpa. After graduation from Mohammedan, Jawara won a scholarship to an all-boys High School, where he enjoyed all his classes, but showed the greatest aptitude in science and mathematics. Upon matriculation in 1945, he worked as a nurse until 1947 at the Victoria Hospital in Bathurst (now Banjul). The limited career and educational opportunities in colonial Gambia led to a year's stint at Prince of Wales College and School in Achimota, Accra, in the then Gold Coast, where he studied science. While at Prince of Wales College and School (popularly known as Achimota College), Jawara showed little interest in politics at a time when Ghana and many colonies in Africa were beginning to become restless for political independence or internal self-government. While he was happy to have met Ghana's founding father, Kwame Nkrumah, the impact did not prove significant at the time.

After attending Achimota College, Jawara won a scholarship to Scotland's Glasgow University to study veterinary medicine. At the time, colonial education was intended to train Africans for the most menial of clerical tasks in the civil service. And it was rare for Gambians to be awarded scholarships in the sciences. It was at Glasgow University in the late 1940s, that Jawara's interest in politics began. In 1948, he joined the African Students Association and was later elected secretary-general and president, respectively. Also, while at Glasgow, Jawara honed his political interests and skills by joining the Student Labour Party Organization, Forward Group, and became active in labour politics of the time. Though never a "leftist", Jawara immersed himself in the Labour Party’s socialist politics and ideology. At Glasgow Jawara met Cheddi Jagan, who later became Premier of British Guiana (now Guyana). Jawara classified this period in his life “as very interesting politically”. It was a moment of rising Pan-Africanist fervour and personal growth politically. He completed his studies in 1953. He later returned to Scotland to gain a further diploma in tropical veterinary medicine at the University of Edinburgh in 1957.

== Return to The Gambia ==
When Jawara returned home in 1953 after completing his studies as a veterinary surgeon, he first served as a veterinary officer. In 1955 he married Augusta Mahoney, daughter of Sir John Mahoney, a prominent Aku in Bathurst. The Aku, a small and educated group, are descendants of freed slaves who settled in The Gambia after manumission. Despite their relatively small size, they came to dominate both the social, political, and economic life of the colony. Many opponents claim that it was pragmatic, albeit an unusual, fulfillment of Jawara's wish to marry a well-to-do Anglican woman.

As a veterinary officer, Jawara traveled the length and breadth of The Gambia for months vaccinating cattle. In the process, he established valuable social contacts and relationships with the relatively well-to-do cattle owners in the protectorate. This group, with the district chiefs and village heads, in later years formed the bulk of his initial political support. As noted, British colonial policy at that time divided The Gambia into two sections; the colony and the protectorate. Adults in the colony area, which included Bathurst and the Kombo St. Mary sub-regions, were franchised, while their counterparts in the protectorate were not. Political activity and representation at the Legislative Council were limited to the colony.

At the time of his return to The Gambia, politics in the colony were dominated by a group of urban elites from Bathurst and the Kombo St. Mary's areas. At a meeting in 1959 at Basse, a major commercial town almost at the end of The Gambia River, the leadership of the People's Progressive Society decided to change its name to challenge the urban-based parties and their leaders. Thus was born the Protectorate People's Party.

The same year, a delegation headed by Sanjally Bojang (a well-off patron and founding member of the new party), Bokarr Fofanah and Madiba Janneh, arrived at Abuko to inform Jawara of his nomination as secretary of the party. Jawara resigned his position as chief veterinary officer in order to contest the 1960 election. The Protectorate People's Party was renamed the People's Progressive Party (PPP) to make the party inclusive as opposed to the generally held perception of it being a Mandinka-based party. Over time, the PPP and Jawara would supersede the urban-based parties and their leaders. This change is what Arnold Hughes termed a "Green Revolution", a political process in which a rural elite emerges to challenge and defeat an urban-based political petty-bourgeoisie.

Jawara's ascendance to the leadership of the party was hardly contested. As one of the few university graduates from the protectorate, the only other possible candidate was Dr. Lamin Marena from Kudang.

== Self-government in The Gambia ==
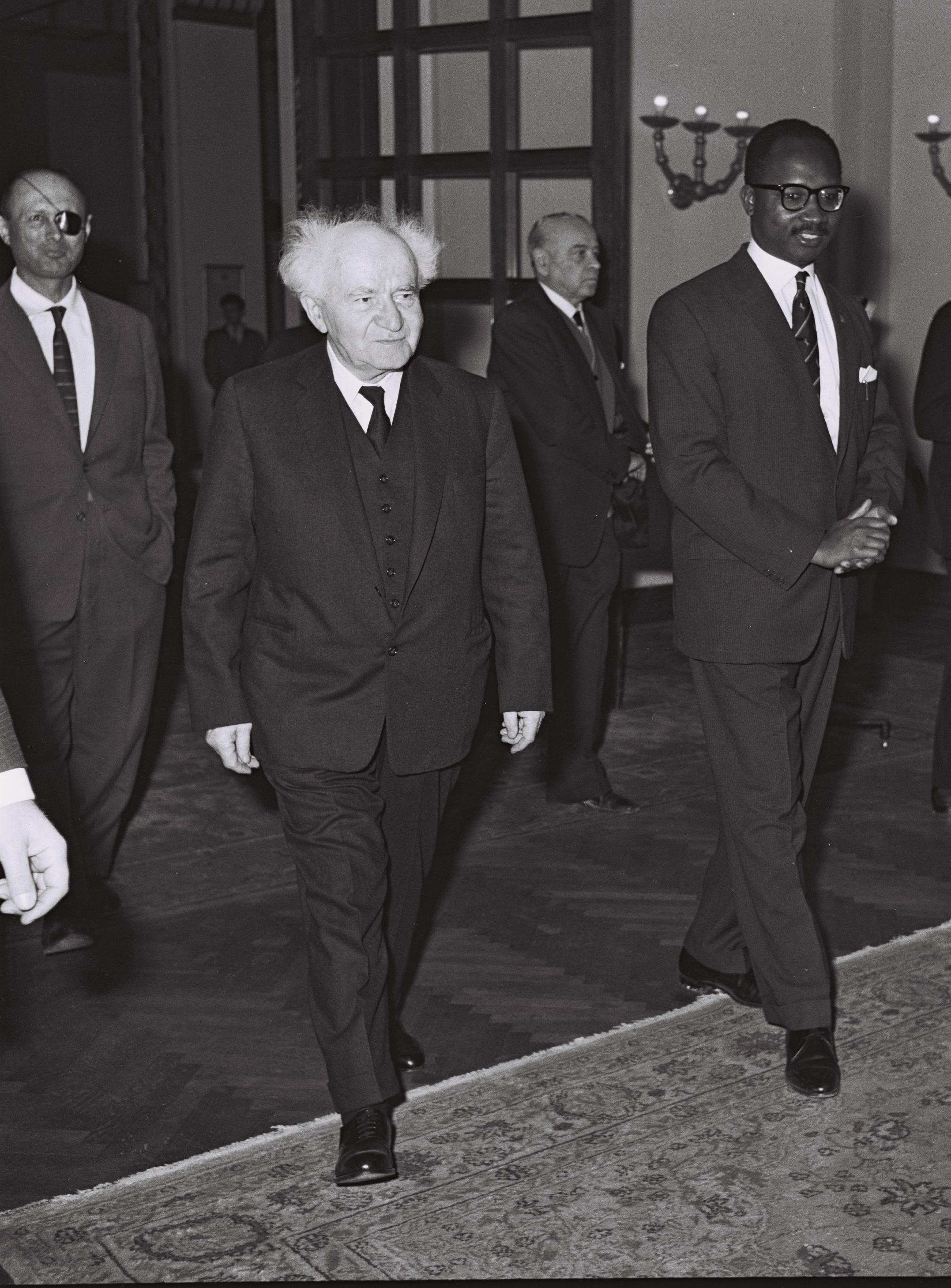
PM Jawara with David Ben-Gurion and General Moshe Dayan during a visit to Israel in 1962.

In 1962, Jawara became prime minister, which laid the foundation for PPP and Jawara domination of The Gambia's political landscape. With Jawara's rise to power after the 1962 elections, the colonial administration began a gradual withdrawal from The Gambia, and self-government was granted in 1963. Jawara was appointed prime minister in the same year, and independence came on 18 February 1965. This completed The Gambia's peaceful transition from colonial rule.

With a small civil service, staffed mostly by the Aku and urban Wollofs, Jawara, and the PPP sought to build a nation and develop an economy to sustain both farmers and urban dwellers. Many in the rural areas hoped that political independence would bring with an immediate improvement in their life circumstances. These high expectations, as in other newly independent ex-colonies, stemmed partly from the extravagant promises made by some political leaders. In time, however, a measure of disappointment set in as the people quickly discovered that their leaders could not deliver on all their promises.

During the self-government period of 1962–65, promising overtures were made from Jawara to Senegal. In November 1962, Jawara asked the United Nations (UN) to appoint experts to assess the future of Senegal and The Gambia together, which U Thant, the Secretary-General, agreed to. The British attitude was said to be one of "friendly encouragement". In March 1964, following a visit from Léopold Sédar Senghor, intentions to coordinate The Gambia's and Senegal's economic programmes were announced. Particular focus was to be placed on the field of agriculture.

== 1981 attempted coup ==
The greatest challenge to Dawda Jawara's rule (other than the coup that ended his power in 1994) was an attempted coup in 1981, headed by a disgruntled ex-politician turned Marxist, Kukoi Samba Sanyang. The coup, which followed a weakening of the economy and allegations of corruption against leading politicians, occurred on July 29, 1981, and was carried out by the leftist National Revolutionary Council, composed of Kukoi Samba Sanyang's Gambia Socialist Revolutionary Party and elements of the "Field Force" (a paramilitary force which constituted the bulk of the country's armed forces).

President Jawara immediately requested military aid from Senegal which deployed 400 troops to The Gambia on July 31, and by August 6 2,700 Senegalese troops had been deployed and they had defeated the coup leaders' forces. Between 500 and 800 people were killed during the coup and the resulting violence.

The attempted coup reflected the desire for change, at least on the part of some civilians and their allies in the Field Force. Despite Kukoi's failure to assume power, the attempted coup revealed major weaknesses within the ruling PPP and society as a whole. The hegemony of the PPP, contraction of intra-party competition, and growing social inequalities were factors that could not be discounted. Also crucial to the causes of the aborted coup was a deteriorating economy whose major victims were the urban youth in particular. In his 1981 New Year message, Jawara explained The Gambia's economic problems thus:

We live in a world saddled with massive economic problems. The economic situation has generally been characterized by rampant inflation, periods of excessive monetary instability, and credit squeeze...soaring oil prices and commodity speculation. These worldwide problems have imposed extreme limitations on the economies like the Gambia.

The most striking consequence of the aborted coup was the intervention of the Senegalese troops at the request of Jawara, as a result of the defense treaty signed between the two countries in 1965. At the time of the aborted coup, Jawara was attending the Wedding of Charles, Prince of Wales, and Lady Diana Spencer in London and flew immediately to Dakar to consult with President Abdou Diouf. While Senegal's intervention was ostensibly to rescue President Jawara's regime, it had the effect of undermining Gambian sovereignty, which was something that had been jealously guarded by Gambians and Jawara in particular. Yet it was relinquished expediently. The presence of Senegalese troops in Banjul was testimony to Jawara's growing reliance on Senegal, which consequently was a source of much resentment.

== Senegambian Confederation ==
Three weeks after the aborted coup and the successful restoration of Jawara by Senegalese troops, Presidents Diouf and Jawara, at a joint press conference, announced plans for the establishment of the Senegambian Confederation. In December 1981, five months after the foiled coup, the treaties of confederation were signed in Dakar. The speed with which the treaties were signed and the lack of input from the bulk of The Gambian population suggested to many that the arrangement was an exercise in political expedience. President Jawara was under great pressure because of the repercussions of the aborted coup and the Senegalese government. Under the treaty with Senegal, Diouf served as president and Jawara as his vice president. A confederal parliament and cabinet were set up with several ministerial positions going to The Gambia. Additionally, a new Gambian army was created as part of a new confederate army.

The creation of a new Gambian army was cause for concern for many observers. Such an institution, it was felt, would by no means diminish the recurrence of the events of July 30, 1981, nor would it guarantee the regime's stability. By agreeing to the creation of an army, Jawara had planted the very seeds of his eventual political demise. The army would in time become a serious contender for political office, different from political parties only in its control over the instruments of violence. Such an atmosphere, however, as the events of 1994 would show, was fertile ground for coups and counter coups. Perhaps more importantly, the creation of a new army diverted limited resources that could have otherwise been used to enhance the strong rural development programmes of the PPP government. The confederation collapsed in 1989.

Jawara did not resort to the authoritarian and often punitive backlash that follows coups in most of Africa. Instead, he made overtures of reconciliation, with judicious and speedy trial and subsequent release of over 800 detainees. Individuals who received death sentence convictions were committed to life in prison instead, and many prisoners were released for lack of sufficient evidence. More serious offenders were tried by an impartial panel of judges drawn from Anglophone Commonwealth countries. International goodwill toward the regime was immediate and generous and before long, Jawara had begun a process of political and economic reconstruction of the country.

== Economic reform ==
The Gambia was incorporated into the world economy as a supplier of agricultural exports (largely groundnuts) and tourism. Since independence, there has been little change in the structure of the economy, which remains very heavily dependent on groundnut production. Agriculture and tourism are the dominant sectors and also the main sources of foreign exchange, employment, and income for the country. Thanks to the growing economy, the government introduced in the 1970s the policy of 'Gambianisation', which led to an expansion of the state's role in the economy. There was a 75 percent increase in total government employment over the period from 1975 to 1980.

In mid-1985, The Gambia under Jawara initiated the Economic Recovery Program (ERP), one of the most comprehensive economic adjustment programmes devised by any country in sub-Saharan Africa. With the aid of a team of economists from the Harvard Institute for International Development and the International Monetary Fund, The Gambia greatly reformed the economic structure of the country. Under ERP, in 1985–86, the deficit was 72 million Dalasis, and it increased to 169 million Dalasis in 1990–91. However, by mid-1986, just a year after the ERP was established, the revival of The Gambian economy had begun. The government reduced its budget deficit, increased its foreign exchange reserves, and eliminated its debt service arrears.

Under the ERP, economic opportunities became more abundant, and many private businessmen and public officials turned to illegal means to make profit. Corruption created a serious legitimacy crisis for the PPP. Several cases of corruption were revealed and these seriously indicted the PPP regime. The Gambia Commercial Development Bank collapsed, largely due to its failure to collect loans. The Asset Management and Recovery Corporation (AMRC) was set up under an Act of Parliament in 1992, but the PPP government was not willing to use its influence to assist AMRC in its recovery exercise. This was particularly embarrassing because the people and organisations with the highest loans were close to PPP. In an embezzlement scheme at The Gambia Cooperative Union (GCU), fraud was revealed in Customs, and through the process of privatisation, it was discovered that many dummy loans had been given to well-connected individuals at GCDB.

A group of para-statal heads and big businessmen closely associated with the PPP (nicknamed the Banjul Mafia) were seen as the culprits responsible for corruption in the public sector. Driven to make profit, many elites did not refrain from manipulating state power to maintain a lifestyle of wealth and privilege. Corruption had become a serious problem in The Gambia, especially during the last two years of the PPP rule.

By 1992, The Gambia was one of the poorest countries in Africa and the world, with a 45-year life expectancy at birth, an infant mortality rate of 130 per 1000 live births, a child mortality rate of 292 per 1000, and an under-five mortality rate of 227 per 1000. At that time, 120 out of every 1000 live births died of malaria. The Gambia also had a 75 percent illiteracy rate, only 40 percent of the population had access to potable water supply, and over 75 percent of the population were living in absolute poverty.

Structural adjustment programmes implemented in response to the economic crisis resulted in government fragmentation, privatisation, less patronage in co-opting various groups and growing corruption. The 30 years the PPP regime operated with diminished resources and therefore could no longer rule as it always had. The credibility of the competitive party system was severely challenged as Jawara's PPP was unable to show that good economic management could lead to benefits for the majority of society. Sir Dawda Kairaba Jawara, the first President of The Gambia, played a significant role in shaping the country's early economic policies following its independence from British colonial rule in 1965. During his tenure, which lasted until 1994, government focused on various economic reforms aimed at promoting stability, development, and growth in The Gambia.

1. Agricultural Development particularly groundnut (peanut) farming, was the backbone of Th Gambia's economy during his presidency.
2. Trade and export promotion which recognising the importance of trade for the Gambian economy, Jawara's government worked to improve the country's trade relations and expand its export base, particularly in agricultural products.
3. Infrastructure development such as investment of road networks, energy, and telecommunications, which especially for rural populations, were crucial for promoting trade and expanding access to markets.
4. The promotion of tourism under Jawara's direction, the Gambia's tourism sector started to grow. His government marketed The Gambia as a travel destination, especially for European tourists, seeing the potential of tourism as a source of foreign cash and jobs.

== Regime survival ==
With Jawara's precarious hold on power at Gambian independence, his low caste status constituted a grave handicap and one which threatened to overshadow his strengths (most notably, a university education). The two pre-independence challenges to Jawara's position demonstrated his vulnerability and illustrated the fact that he could not rely upon the undivided loyalty of the party's founding members. At independence, Jawara's lieutenants regarded him as their representative, almost a nominal leader, and clearly intended him to promote their personal advancement.

Given these circumstances, Jawara's task was to overcome his low caste status, assert his authority over the party, and secure control over its political direction. In doing this, he did not use coercion. Politically inspired “disappearances” were never an element of PPP rule; neither opponents nor supporters suffered harassment or periods of detention on fabricated charges. That Jawara was able to eschew coercive techniques and still survive reflected an element of good fortune, and yet his skillful political leadership was also crucial. Within his own party Jawara was fortunate to be surrounded by individuals willing to refrain from violence to achieve their goals, and yet much of the credit for this restraint must go to Jawara—his skillful manipulation of patronage resources, cultivation of affective ties and shrewd balancing of factions within the PPP. Lacking the coercive option, and given that affective ties, which had to be earned, were a medium- to long-term resource, Jawara initially relied heavily on instrumental ties and distribution of patronage. His limited resource base posed an obvious, though not insurmountable, problem.

Within the ruling group, ministerial positions — which provided a generous salary, perks and for some, access to illicit wealth—constituted the most sought after form of patronage and yet, before 1970, the number of ministerial posts did not exceed seven.

By 1992, the number remained a comparatively modest fourteen. Despite these limits, Jawara skillfully used all the various permutations of patronage distribution (appointment, promotion, termination, demotion, and rehabilitation) to dramatise his power over subordinates’ political futures and entrench himself as a leader.

In response to the pre-1965 challenges to his authority, Jawara moved to reduce the size, cohesion, and authority of the founding members as a group. Many of the party's earliest adherents (even those who showed no outward sign of disloyalty) lost ministerial posts during the early years of PPP rule. Jawara may not have used force, but neither was he hampered by sentiment; his pragmatism and willingness to demote, or even drop, former supporters in order to strengthen his personal political position was apparent. Jawara further strengthened his political position with the incorporation of new sources of support within the ruling group.

His enthusiasm for political accommodation stemmed from the closely related imperatives of weakening the influence of the PPP's original members and avoiding political isolation. The original group resented the fact that newcomers had not participated in the early struggle for power and yet were now enjoying the fruits of their labour. The secondary factor of ethno-regional considerations compounded this resentment; those who were co-opted came from all ethnic groups in the former colony and protectorate.

Jawara's popular support and cultivation of affective ties were crucial for easing the pressure on scarce patronage resources. Although the skillful distribution of patronage and associated tolerance of corruption (to be discussed later) played an important role in the PPP's survival, Jawara did not rely on elite-level resource distribution as heavily as some of his counterparts.

== Corruption and political survival ==
For many years observers viewed corruption in The Gambia as significantly less prevalent than in many other African states. In retrospect, this view appears overstated, though it is true that corruption did not reach the heights seen elsewhere. Jawara himself refrained from excessive self-enrichment and many of his lieutenants followed suit. Conflicting survival imperatives—in particular, the need for foreign aid and popular support, both of which were unlikely to be forthcoming under a thoroughly corrupt regime, persuaded Jawara to set some limits on “allowable” corruption. The possibility of exposure in parliament or by the press provided a further constraint.

Nevertheless, events during the closing years of the People's Progressive Party rule together with post-coup revelations and inquiries suggest that corruption was both a significant phenomenon and one which played an important role in the PPP's survival. Jawara understood the political advantages of corruption. Fundamentally, corruption formed an important component of the patronage network, facilitating elite accumulation. It provided a means of creating and sustaining mutually beneficial and supportive relationships between PPP politicians (headed by Jawara), senior civil servants, and Gambian businessmen.

Initially, then, corruption played a significant part in the survival of the PPP, uniting political, bureaucratic, and business interests in a series of mutually beneficial and supportive relationships. In the longer term, however, it served to undermine the regime. Perhaps the first indication of this occurred in 1981 when, during the coup attempt of that year, Kukoi Samba Sanyang cited “corruption and the squandering of public funds” as a primary motive of intervention. No doubt there was a strong element of opportunism in Sanyang's actions, yet the fact that he seized upon corruption as a suitable justification for his actions reflected increasing public awareness of the problem.

Just a month prior to the coup, Reverend Ian Roach had spoken out publicly against corruption, the local press reported numerous instances of low-level bureaucratic theft, and higher up, Jawara's leniency towards the ministers and civil servants towards the end of the 1970s was widely resented. The increased public awareness of corruption weakened the PPP regime and furnished the 1994 conspirators with a suitable pretext for intervention. Since many soldiers reportedly regarded their unsatisfactory living conditions as a manifestation of corruption, it also gave them a motive. Jawara may have underestimated the real risk a new army would pose to himself and the country, and in fact, may have dragged his feet in dealing accordingly with corruption. To this accusation he responded:

I believe in the rule of law and democracy. We are a poor country where petty jealousies exist. One buys a car or builds a house, so he must be corrupt, and Jawara did not do anything. I am expected to serve as a judge and policeman at the same time. At the Cooperative Union, it was agreed that a Presidential Commission be established to investigate the alleged corruption. Action was taken, then the coup occurred. We must let the law take its course. We were serious to run a government according to the rule of law and for this we were highly rated and respected.

Many African leaders are aware of the positive relationship between popular support and elite acquiescence. However, resource shortages had more likely than not persuaded leaders to priorities in favour of elites. In The Gambia, two additional factors persuaded Jawara to pursue a somewhat different route to political survival. On the one hand, the PPP needed to win successive multi-party elections. On the other, Jawara's rejection of coercion as a survival technique meant that overt public challenges could not simply be suppressed; it was vital the latent threat posed by specific societal groups remain dormant. Fortunately, Jawara did have a great deal of public support.

== 1994 coup ==
In December 1991, Jawara announced that he would not seek re-election in 1992. After 30 years of leading his country, he decided to retire. However, his announcement was met with panic, so he consented to stand for re-election again. The question of his retirement continued to loom over The Gambia's political future, however, and dissent mounted. He was re-elected with 56% of the vote.

On 22 July 1994, a group of soldiers led by Lieutenant Yahya Jammeh stormed the capital. The coup was successful and Jawara was exiled until 2002. Compared with the previous attempt to overthrow Jawara, though, this coup was deemed "bloodless". Jawara escaped unharmed: he was taken to Senegal by an American warship that was in the area when the coup began. Jawara had hoped that his work would create an economically prosperous society based on his priorities: democracy, unity, and tolerance for personal differences. However, the new self-appointed, five-man ruling council dissolved the constitution and established a nationwide curfew until democracy was reinstated (at least on paper).

He returned to The Gambia as an elder statesman, but was forbidden to take part in politics for the rest of his life. He went to Nigeria in 2007 after being selected to head a West African team (ECOWAS) to assess Nigeria's preparedness for its April 2007 presidential election. He then took residence in the town of Fajara, where he died

On 3 February 2017, Jawara was visited at his home by the newly elected president Adama Barrow and pledged to render support to Barrow's government.

When he died, Sir Dawda was the last living Gambian who had been conferred a knighthood (in the 1966 New Year Honours) under the monarchy of the Gambia.

== Depiction on Gambian currency ==
Sir Dawda's portrait is depicted on various banknotes and coins of The Gambian dalasi from 1971 to 1994.

== Honours ==
=== National ===
- Gambia:
  - Grand Master and Grand Commander of the Order of the Republic of The Gambia

=== Foreign ===
- Mali:
  - Grand Cross of the National Order of Mali
- Netherlands:
  - Commander of the Order of the Golden Ark
- Portugal:
  - Grand Collar of the Order of Prince Henry (1993)
- South Korea:
  - Grand Order of Mugunghwa (1984)
- United Kingdom:
  - Knight Grand Cross of the Order of St Michael and St George (GCMG) Sir

Political offices
Preceded by Pierre Sarr N'Jie	Prime Minister of the Gambia; 1962–1970	Succeeded by Himself as the first President of the Gambia
Preceded by Elizabeth II as Queen of the Gambia	President of the Gambia; 1970–1994	Succeeded by Yahya Jammeh
Diplomatic posts
Preceded by Ibrahim Babangida	Chairman of the Economic Community of West African States; 1989–1990	Succeeded by Blaise Compaoré
Preceded by Blaise Compaoré	Chairman of the Economic Community of West African States; 1991–1992	Succeeded by Abdou Diouf
