= People's Progressive Party (The Gambia) =

Political party in the Gambia

- Leader: Ousman Madikay Faal
- Founder: Dawda Jawara
- Founded: 14 February 1959
- Ideology: Third Way; Agrarianism
- Political position: Centre to centre-left
- National Assembly: 0 / 58

Website
- pppgambia.com

The People's Progressive Party is a political party in the Gambia. It was the dominant ruling party of the Gambia from 1962 to 1994, during the presidency of party founder Dawda Jawara.

The People's Progressive Party lost power after the 1994 Gambian coup d'état, which saw the beginning of the authoritarian regime of Yahya Jammeh. The Alliance for Patriotic Reorientation and Construction (APRC) then became the dominant party of the Gambia. Today, the People's Progressive Party remains active, but lacks the same level of influence it exercised in the late 20th century.

== History ==
The party was founded in 1959 as the Protectorate People's Party (PPP) and was later changed to the People's Progressive Party. The party won the 1962 general election, and in October 1963, upon the attainment of self-government, their leader, Dawda Jawara, became Prime Minister of the Gambia. With the republican referendum in 1970, Jawara became the first President of the Gambia.

In 1981, there was an attempted coup intended to overthrow the then-incumbent PPP government. It was a civilian-led coup attempt with some support from the Gambia Field Force. The death toll is debated, being anywhere from 500 to 1,000 lives lost. The coup was put down by Senegalese intervention and as a result, Senegal and the Gambia formed the Senegambia Confederation.

The People's Progressive Party lost political power following the 1994 Gambian coup d'état. The coup was carried out by military officers in the Gambian National Army (GNA). It was a bloodless coup that managed to overthrow Dawda Jawara and his government. The Gambia was ruled militarily until 1996 when Yahya Jammeh was elected as president as a candidate of the newly formed Alliance for Patriotic Reorientation and Construction (APRC) party. The subsequent National Assembly elections brought even more power to the APRC, winning 33 out of the 45 seats.

The People's Progressive Party was banned by the APRC in all subsequent elections; however, it has joined with other opposition parties to form political coalitions. In 2005, the PPP joined the National Alliance for Democracy and Development (NADD). Then for the 2016 presidential election, PPP joined the Coalition 2016, where Adama Barrow was declared the coalition's candidate and subsequently won.

== Ideology ==
The People's Progressive Party was created by rural populations as a reaction against urban areas exerting control over the political arena post-colonialism.

The People's Progressive Party's website currently states, "The PPP believes that a less pervasive and intrusive government as opposed to the current over-centralized and authoritarian regime is necessary in order to release the creative energies of the Gambian people and to encourage wider social, economic, and political inclusion. Our party intends to reduce the power of government and return to grassroots democracy."

== Opposition ==
During the People's Progressive Party's rule, there were times of growing discontent with the government. Not only did opposition candidates stem from that discontent, but many opposition parties were created to run against the PPP.

=== National Convention Party (NCP) ===
The National Convention Party (NCP) was an opposition party to the PPP launched on September 7, 1975. The leader of the party at the time was Sheriff M. Dibba, the former first Vice-President of the Gambia. After a political scandal, he resigned as Vice-President in 1972 and later founded the NCP.

The 1981 Gambian coup d'état was led by a former NCP candidate. Members of the People's Progressive Party suspected that the NCP was in support of the coup attempt and subsequently, many members of the NCP were arrested.

In the 1987 elections, the NCP won five seats in the legislature. Though Dawda Jawara won the presidential election, Dibba, the presidential candidate from the NCP, won 28% of the vote. Then in 1992, the NCP won six seats in the legislature.

=== Alliance for Patriotic Reorientation and Construction (APRC) ===
The Alliance for Patriotic Reorientation and Construction (APRC) is a political party formed after the 1994 coup d'état. The ideology that led to the coup was discontent with the PPP; alleged corruption and a lack of economic development over time. The main figure that dominated the APRC was Yahya Jammeh, who became president in 1996 and served until the 2016 Gambian presidential election. Under Jammeh and the APRC's rule, there were numerous reports of human rights abuses and suppression of the media.

== Notable members ==
=== Sir Dawda Kairaba Jawara ===
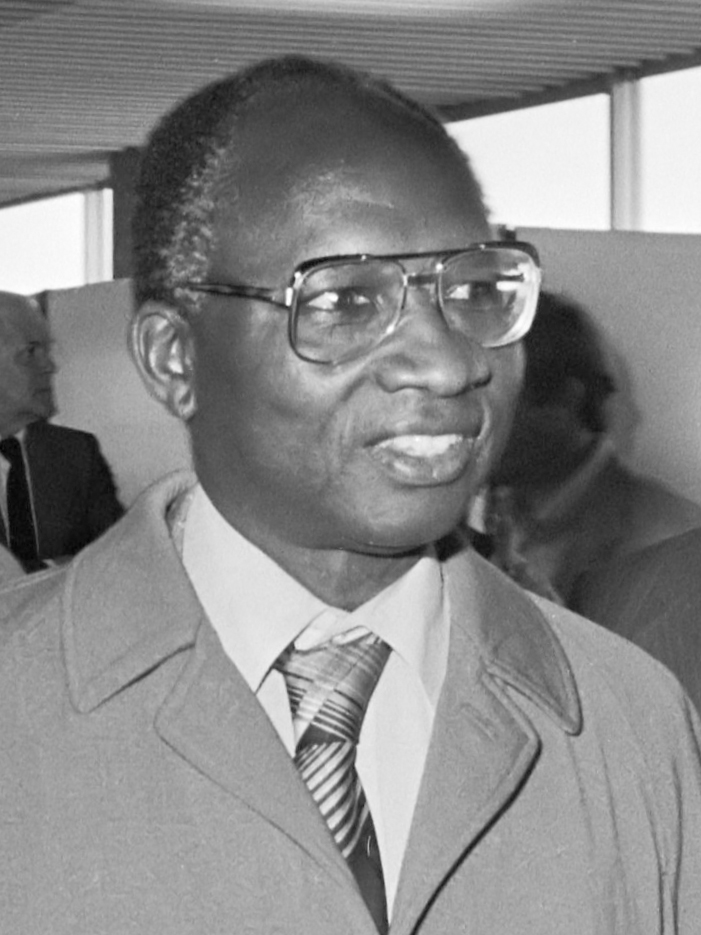
Dawda Jawara, president of the Gambia from 1970 to 1994 and a member of the PPP.

Sir Dawda Kairaba Jawara served as the leader of the People's Progressive Party from 1959 until 1994 when he was overthrown. He is responsible for changing the name of the party from the Protectorate People's Party to the People's Progressive Party. Before serving as president for the Gambia he was elected into the legislature in 1960. During this time, he also served as the minister of education. He later became the prime minister of the Gambia in 1962 and was knighted in 1966, following independence. Upon the creation of a new constitution in 1970, Jawara became the president and served until the 1994 Gambian coup d'état.

Following the coup, Jawara was exiled and lived in Senegal and later London. He was later given amnesty but was not given the right to participate in the Gambian political arena. He formally resigned as PPP leader in 2002.

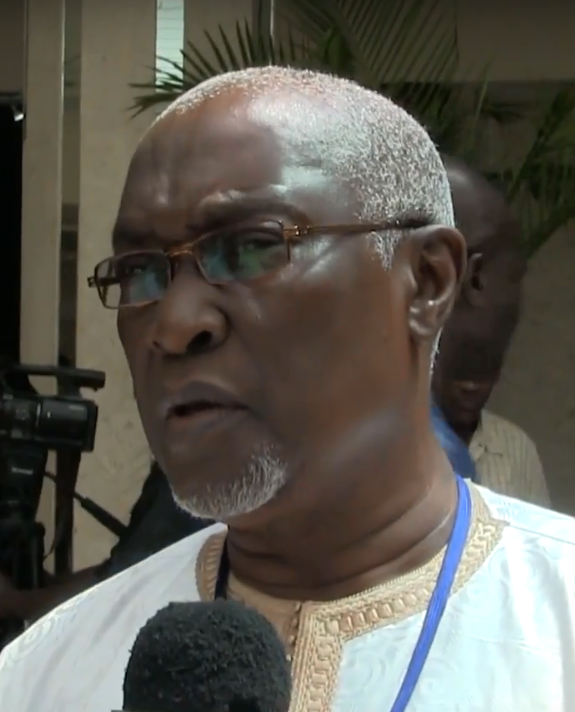
Omar Jallow, leader of the PPP from 2001 to 2018.

Jawara died on August 27, 2019, at 95 years old.

=== Omar A. Jallow ===
Omar A. Jallow succeeded Jawara as leader of the People's Progressive Party. He was a member of Dawda Jawara's cabinet up until the 1994 coup d'état, when he was arrested. Under the Jammeh administration, he was reportedly jailed over 22 times.

After Jammeh was not re-elected following the 2016 Gambian presidential election, Jallow was appointed the minister of agriculture as he was in the Jawara administration.

At the 2018 national convention, the party's first since its ban was lifted, Jallow stepped down as leader. Papa Njie was elected in his place. In 2020, Njie was appointed as the Gambian High Commissioner to Nigeria. Kebba E. Jallow then became interim leader, and was elected as leader at the party's 2021 national convention.

== Electoral history ==
=== Presidential elections ===
Election	Party candidate	Votes	%	Result
1982	Dawda Jawara	137,020	72.44%	Elected ✓
1987	Dawda Jawara	123,385	59.18%	Elected ✓
1992	Dawda Jawara	117,549	58.48%	Elected ✓

=== National Assembly elections ===
Election	Leader	Votes	%	Seats	+/–	Position	Position
1960	Dawda Jawara	25,490	36.9%	9 / 19	New	▲1st	Opposition
1962	Dawda Jawara	56,343	57.7%	18 / 32	▲9	1st	Majority
1966	Dawda Jawara	81,313	65.3%	24 / 32	▲6	1st	Majority
1972	Dawda Jawara	65,388	63.0%	28 / 32	▲4	1st	Majority
1977	Dawda Jawara	123,297	69.6%	29 / 35	▲1	1st	Majority
1982	Dawda Jawara	102,545	61.7%	27 / 35	▼2	1st	Majority
1987	Dawda Jawara	119,248	56.4%	31 / 36	▲4	1st	Majority
1992	Dawda Jawara	109,059	54.3%	25 / 36	▼6	1st	Majority
The PPP was banned from 1994 to 2016							Extra-parliamentary
2017	Omar Jallow	9,503	2.5%	2 / 58	▲2	▲6th	Coalition (UDP-NRP-PPP)
2022	Kebba E. Jallow	1,168	0.2%	0 / 58	▼2	▼10th	Extra-parliamentary
