= Bakau =

- Town
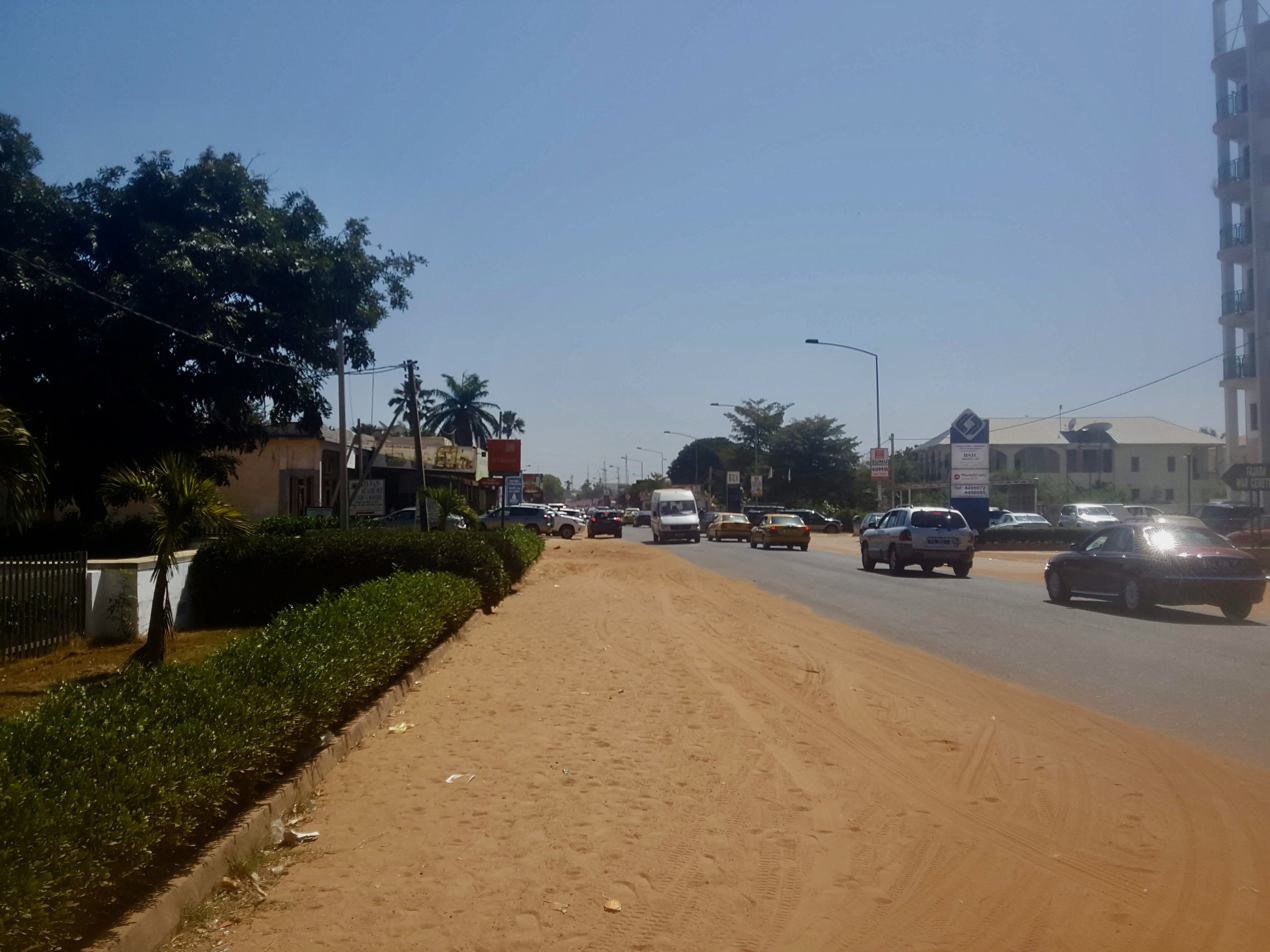
- View of Bakau

- Location in The Gambia
- Coordinates: 13°28′50″N 16°40′11″W
- Country: The Gambia
- Division: Banjul
- District: Kanifing
- Elevation: 21 ft (6.4 m)

Population (2013)
  - Total: 43,098
- Time zone: UTC+00:00 (GMT)

Bakau is a town on the Atlantic coast of Gambia, west of Gambia's capital city of Banjul. It is known for its botanical gardens, its crocodile pool Bakau Kachikally and for the beaches at Cape Point. Bakau is the first major suburb outside Banjul and the most developed town in the Gambia. Close to Bakau and Banjul is Gambia's largest city, Serekunda.

== History ==
Legend has it that Bakau grew up around the holy crocodile pool in Kachikally, the central district of Bakau. Bakau itself was a small village at the turn of the 19th century and grew in importance as it became a favourite place for private residences of colonial administrators, especially along the beautiful palm fringed beaches. Despite being a major town, the old village still exists and is run like any other in the Gambia, with an 'Alkali' (similar to 'Mayor') and divided into Kabilos. There exists a much smaller village within the old village called Bakau Wasulung Kunda, indicating the migrant origins of its inhabitants. As people began to move out of Banjul, government allocated residential areas quickly sprang around the old village, acquiring new names in the process. What were farms of the local population became well planned suburbs filled with bungalows, such as Fajara, New Town, Cape Point, Mile7 and Farrowkono (formerly used as gardens by the locals)

== Economy ==
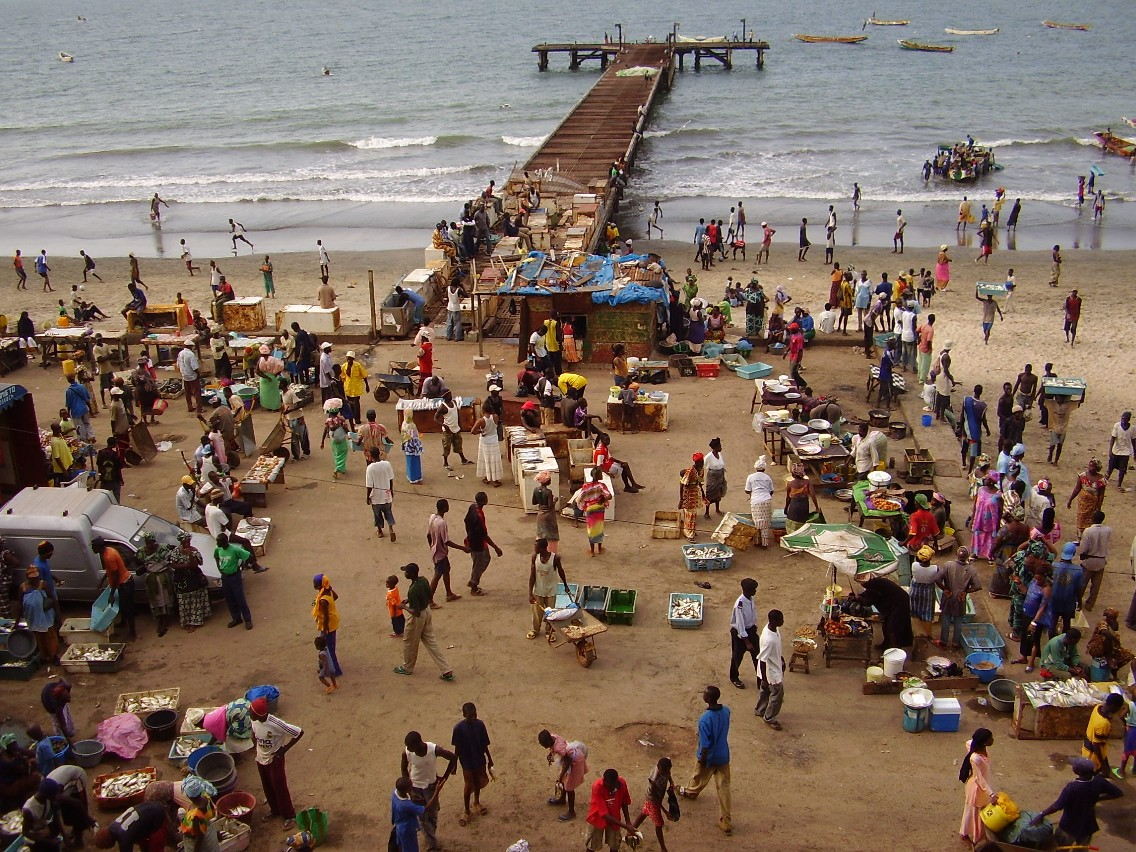
Bakau fish market

Tourism is the most important business activity in Bakau providing a lot of employment, as well as income for the municipal authority. At Cape Point there are a few hotels on a beach, arguably superior to the main Atlantic Ocean beach, which is home to most of the hotels in the country. In town there are a few guest houses. There is also a major market along the main road famous for its fruit and vegetables.

Fishing is also another major business activity and there is a fishing port by the town beach, together with a wharf where a market attracts many visitors. One of the few ice plants in the country is located there.

Gardening is also another major business activity in which the local women are mostly engaged on for livelihood. The town has many shops, selling different types of products and services along the Sait Matty Road.

Afrinat International Airlines had its head office in Bakau.

- Bakau Primary School
- NewTown Primary School
- Marina International Scholl
- West African International School
- Gambia Methodist Academy
- American International School
- Glory Baptist Senior Secondary School
- Bakau Upper Basic School
- Presidents' Awards Scheme
- Katchikally Nursery School
- Starlight School

== Infrastructure ==
Bakau is perhaps the most developed settlement in the Gambia, with excellent communication facilities. Only the major roads are paved and the rate of electricity connection is almost universal. There are several hotels and a few guest houses. The only national stadium, the multi-purpose Independence Stadium, is located here. The national broadcaster, Radio Gambia, is located in Bakau at its Mile 7 studios. UN country headquarters is also located here with different foreign embassies. There is also a large military camp, a police barracks and a fire brigade.

== Attractions ==
- Kachikally Museum and Crocodile Pool, Bakau
- Botanical Gardens, Atlantic Boulevard Road, Bakau
- Fajara Hotel, Fajara, Bakau
- Ocean bay Hotel, Cape Point
- African Village Hotel, Bakau
- Cape Point Hotel, Cape Point
- Sun Beach Hotel, Cape Point
- The Garden Guest House, Bakau
- Bakau Basketball Academy, Bakau
- Swedish and Norwegian Consulate
- Independence Stadium, Bakau
- Rock Heights, Cape Point
- Tanbi Wetland Complex, Old Cape Road
- UNICEF office
- British embassy, 48, Atlantic boulevard, Fajara
- Fajara war cemetery

== Notable people ==
- Amie Bensouda, corporate lawyer
- Adama Bojang, footballer
- Alieu Fadera, footballer
- Pa Amadou Gai, footballer
- I.M. Garba-Jahumpa, former minister and politician
- Malando Gassama, percussionist
- Hassan Bubacar Jallow, Chief Justice of The Gambia
- Lamin Jallow, footballer
- Momodou Malcolm Jallow, Politician & Human Rights Activist
- Abdou Jammeh, footballer
- Abdoulie Janneh, diplomat
- Dawda Jawara, former head of state of The Gambia
- Jizzle, musician
- Bubacarr Jobe, footballer
- Momodou Lamin Sedat Jobe, Diplomat, Fr. Foreign Minister of The Gambia
- Basiru Mahoney, judge
- Florence Mahoney, educator and professor
- Kekuta Manneh, footballer
- Jaysuma Saidy Ndure, athlete
- Njogu Demba-Nyrén, footballer
- Lenrie Peters, surgeon, Playwright, Novelist, Poet, Educationist
- Dembo Saidykhan, footballer
- Amadou Sanyang, footballer
- Raymond Sock, judge

== Gallery ==
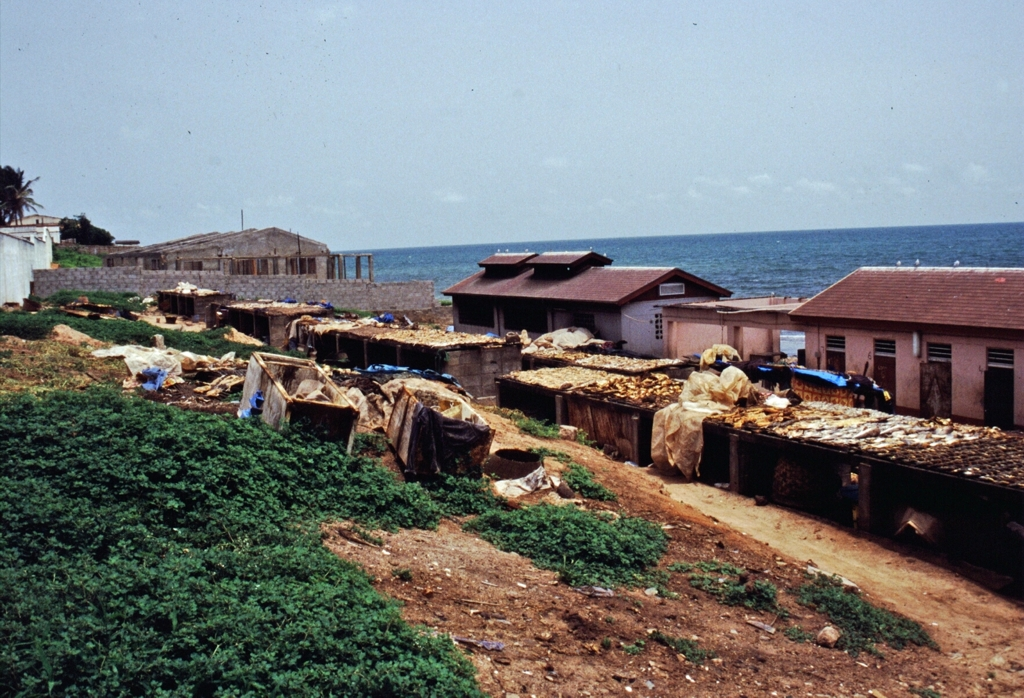

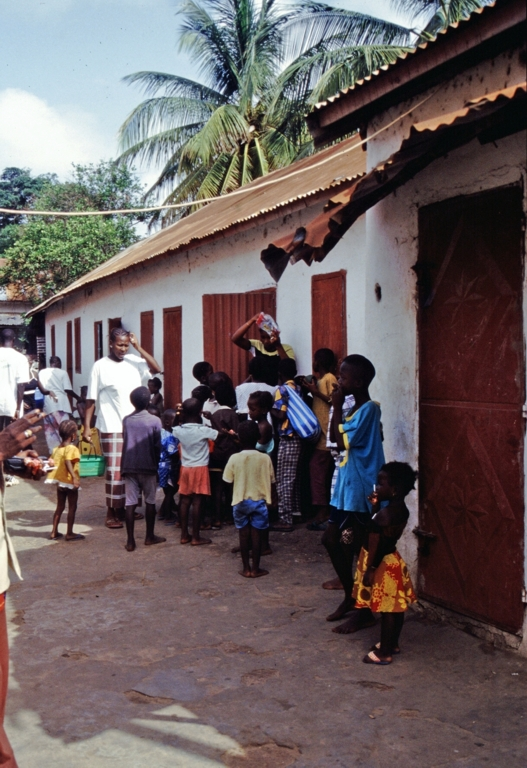

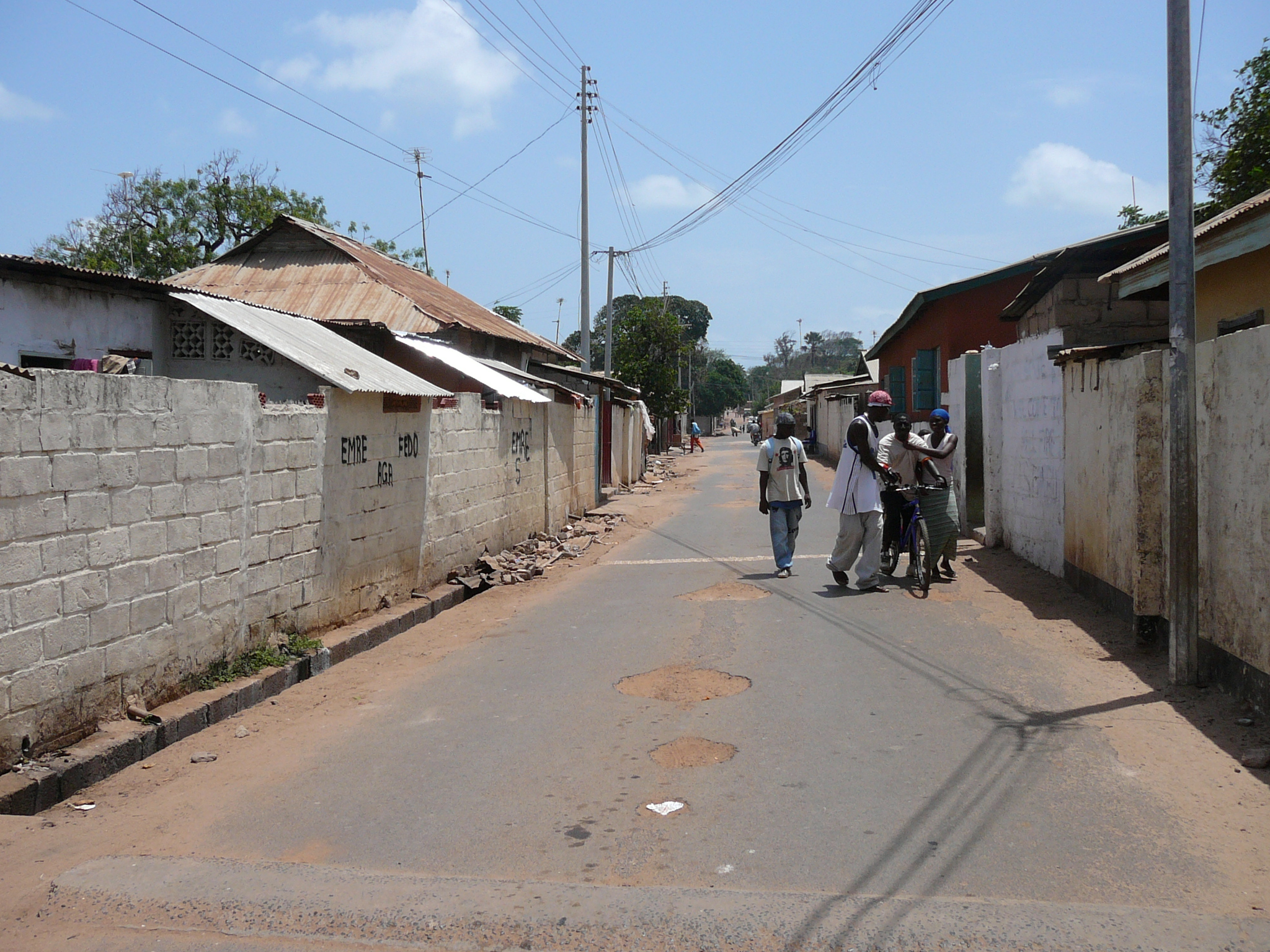

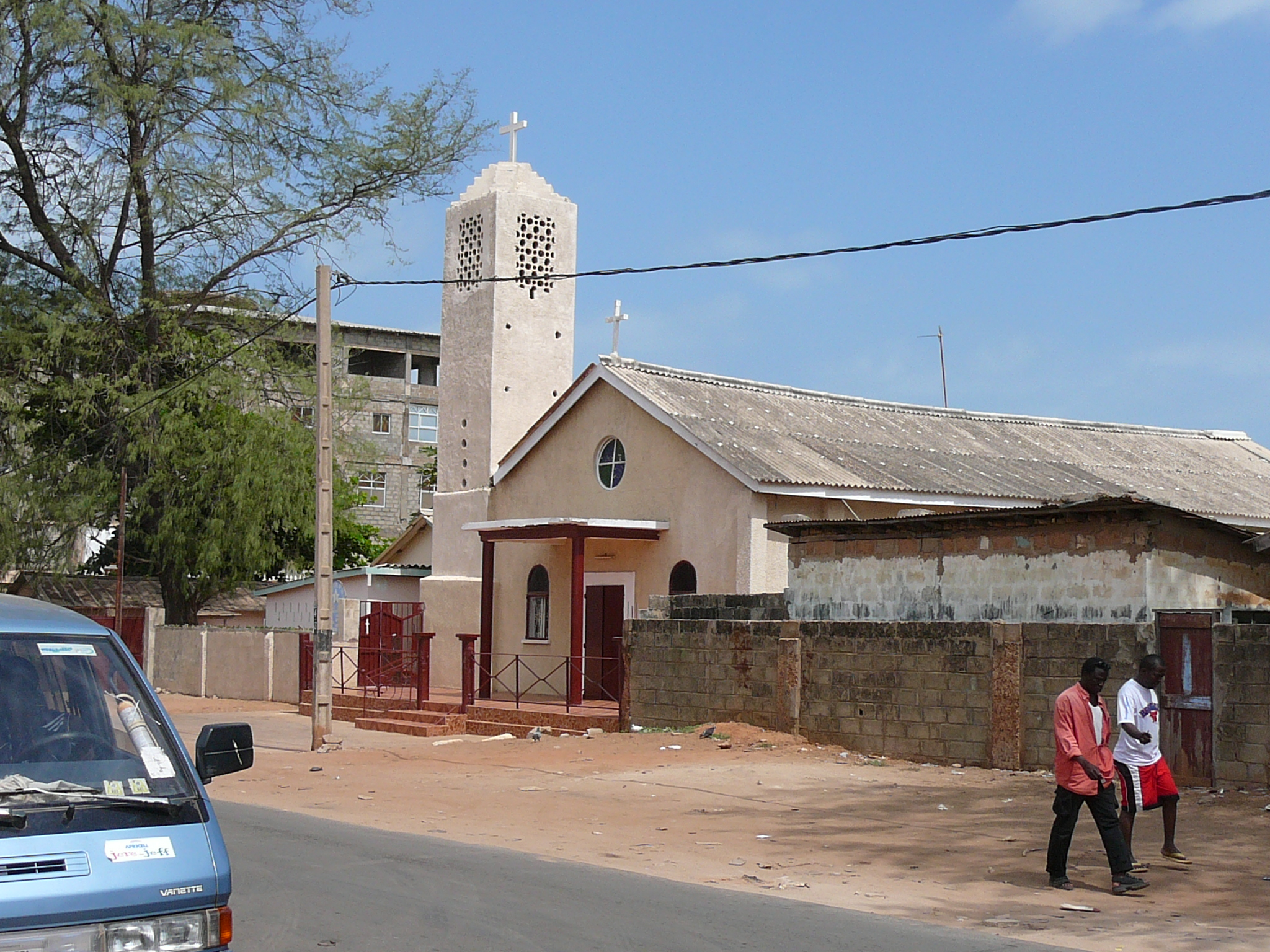
Church in Bakau

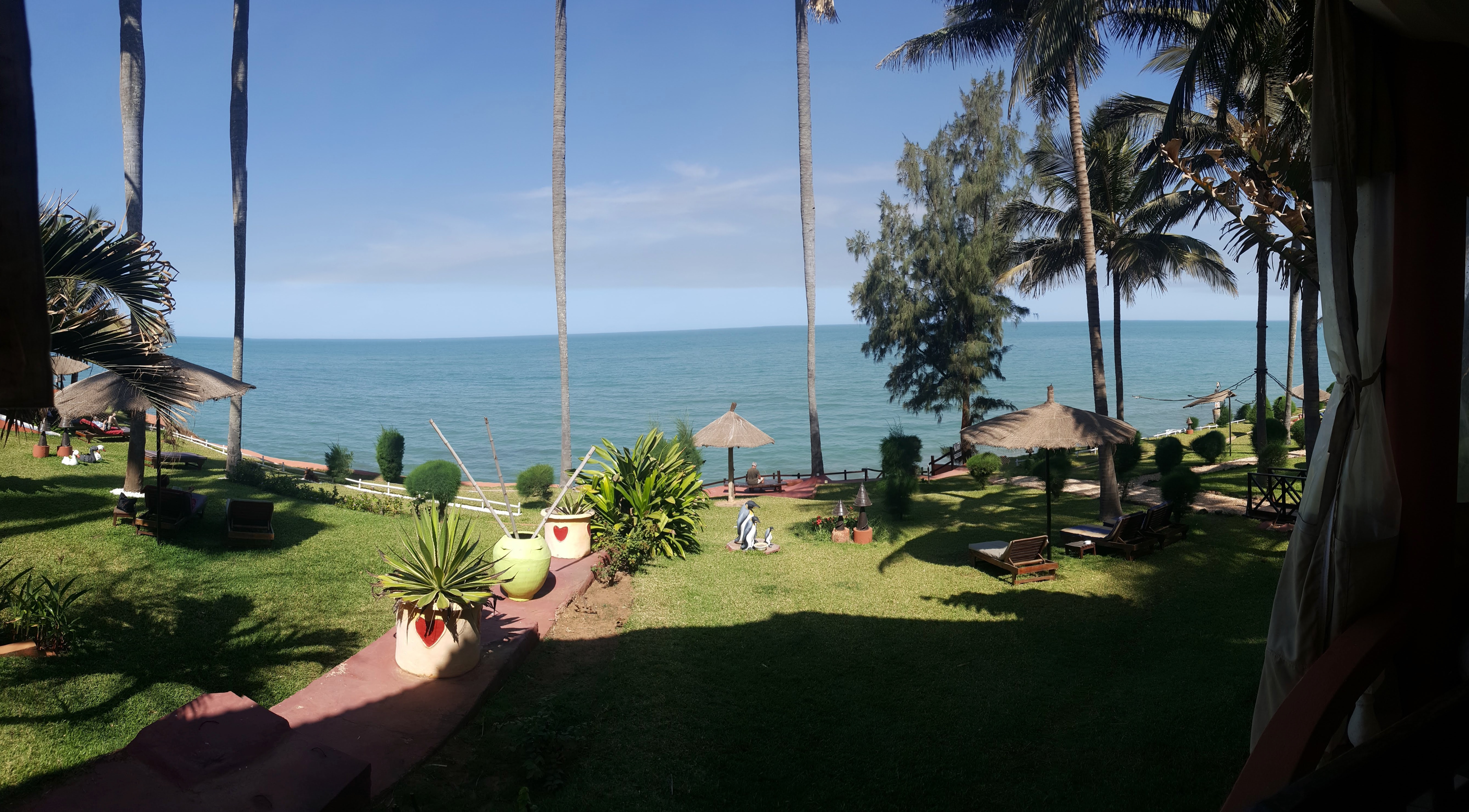
Atlantic Ocean from a Bakau resort

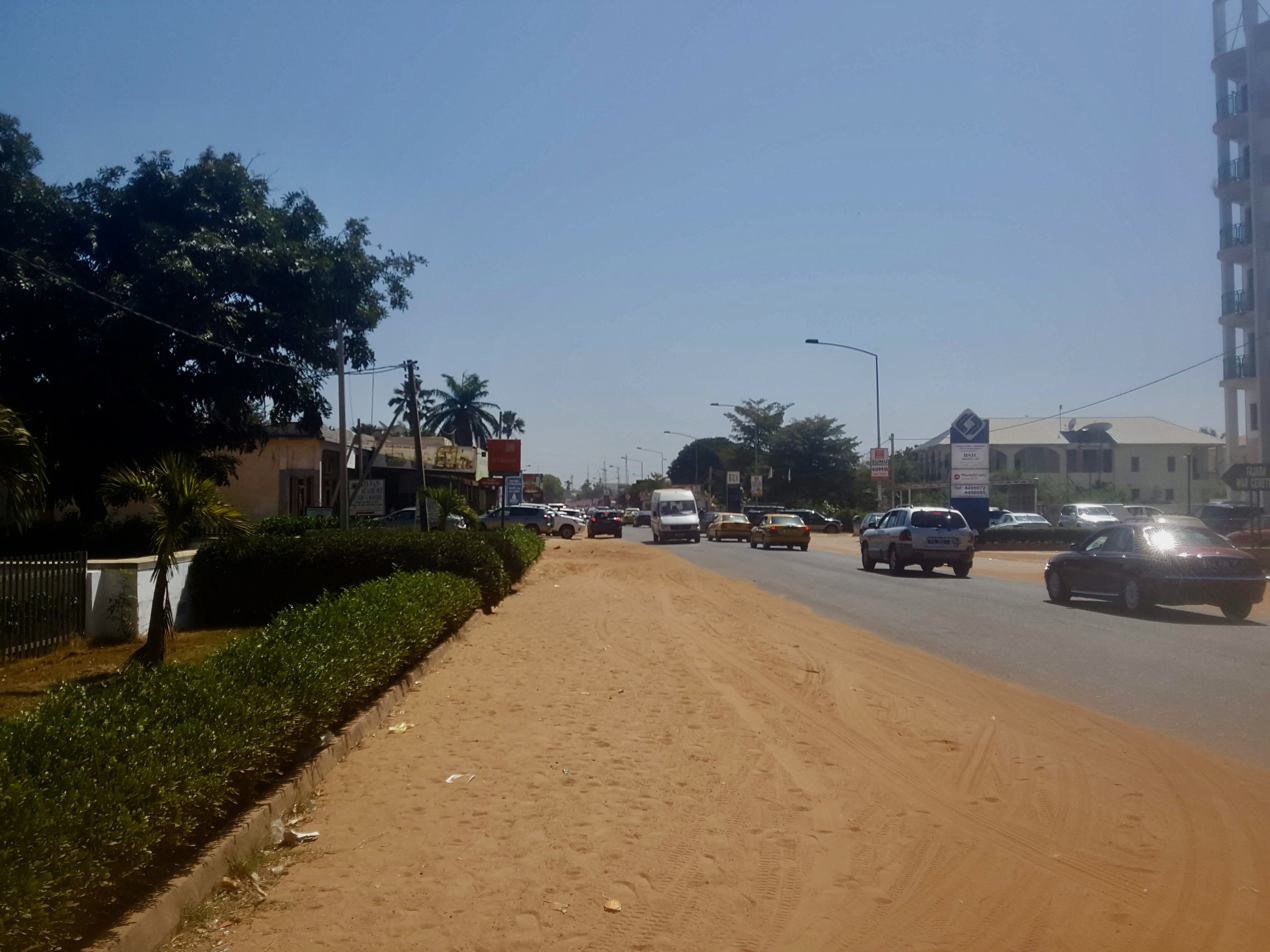
Road in Bakau
