= Abubacarr Tambadou =

Gambian lawyer and politician

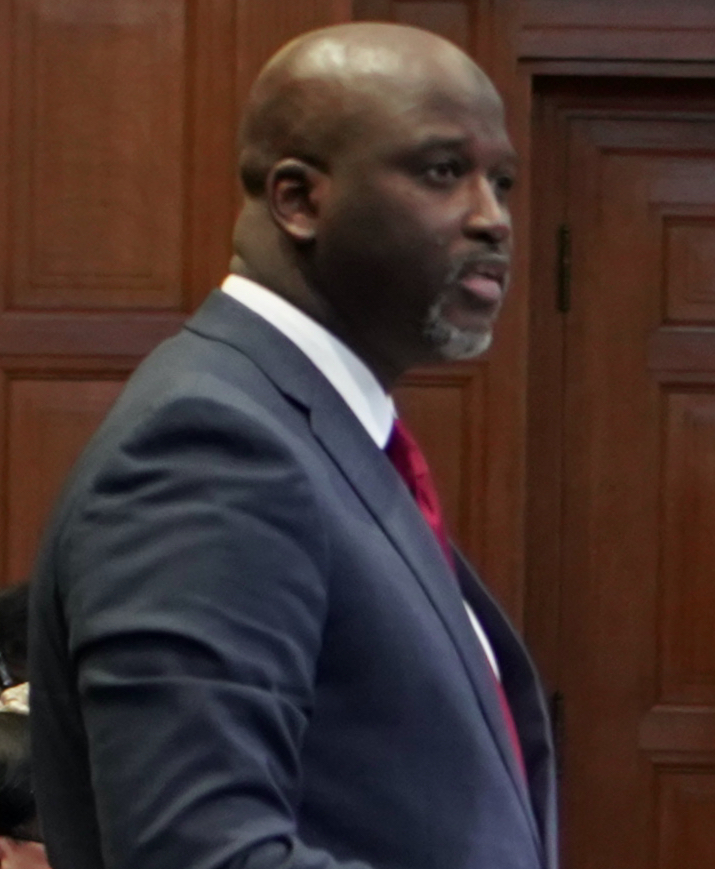
- Tambadou in December 2019

Registrar of the International Residual Mechanism for Criminal Tribunals
- Incumbent
- Assumed office 1 July 2020
- Preceded by: Olufemi Elias

Minister of Justice Attorney General
- In office 7 February 2017 – 30 June 2020
- President: Adama Barrow
- Preceded by: Mama Fatima Singhateh
- Succeeded by: Dawda A. Jallow

Personal details
- Born: Abubacarr Marie Tambadou; 12 December 1972 (age 53)
- Education: University of Warwick; SOAS, University of London

Abubacarr Marie "Ba" Tambadou (born 12 December 1972) is a Gambian lawyer and politician who is currently the Registrar of the International Residual Mechanism for Criminal Tribunals, an international court founded by the United Nations Security Council. From 2017 to 2020, Tambadou served as Minister of Justice and Attorney General in Gambian President Adama Barrow's cabinet.

Tambadou was included in Time's 100 Most Influential People in 2020, in recognition of his leadership in prosecuting Myanmar for the Rohingya genocide. He was later nominated for a Nobel Peace Prize for the same reason in 2021.

== Early life and education ==
Tambadou was born in 1972, the son of Alhaji Marie Tambadou. He has 18 siblings and was raised in Banjul, the capital city of The Gambia. Tambadou attended Saint Augustine's High School from 1987 to 1992 and played football in his youth to a high standard, winning caps for the national team. In order to not disappoint his father, Tambadou abandoned sport to pursue academics, and was offered a place to study law at the University of Warwick in the United Kingdom. He attended Warwick from 1994 to 1997, and in 1999 he was called to the bar as a barrister at Lincoln's Inn. From 2001 to 2002, he completed a master's degree in international human rights law at the School of Oriental and African Studies (SOAS) in London.

== Legal career ==
Tambadou first worked as a public prosecutor at the Gambian Ministry of Justice from 1997 to 1999, ensuring national prosecution of local crimes. He then worked as state counsel from 1999 to 2000, with supervisory responsibilities over public prosecutors. He then went into private legal practice, working at Sheriff M. Tambadou Law Chambers in Banjul from 2000 to 2003, with a particular focus on human rights law.

In 2003, he left the Gambia to work at the United Nations International Criminal Tribunal for Rwanda in Arusha, Tanzania, as an associate legal officer, a position he held from 2003 to 2005. From 2005 to 2008, he worked as a trial attorney, where he was responsible for prosecuting violations of international human rights law in Rwanda. He secured the prosecution of four individuals, including former Rwandan army general Augustin Bizimungu. In 2008, he became an appeals counsel and handled a number of cases on appeal, including The Prosecutor vs Augustin Bizimungu and The Prosecutor vs Théoneste Bagosora. For a time, he acted as officer-in-charge in the absence of the senior appeals counsel. In 2012, he became special assistant to the prosecutor, a role that included drafting papers and policy, leading briefings, and acting as chief of staff for the prosecutor's immediate office. The prosecutor since 2003 has been former Gambian justice minister Hassan Bubacar Jallow. Tambadou left the court in 2016 after it closed.

=== Minister of Justice ===
Tambadou was announced as President of the Gambia Adama Barrow's choice for Minister of Justice and Attorney General. On 7 February 2017, he was sworn in at a ceremony at Kairaba Beach Hotel. Barrow praised him by saying "A justice system is very important in any society, and if you have someone who is willing to work with the Gambian people and who is also good at it, therefore, the Gambia will surely have the best judicial system." Minister of Foreign Affairs Ousainou Darboe, a lawyer himself, said that Tambadou was "not new to the judicial system and very versatile in the area that he is assigned to overseen." The same day he held a meeting with all the staff at the Ministry of Justice.

== Personal life ==
Tambadou can speak six languages: English, French, Wolof, Mandinka, Krio and Soninke.
