= Hawa Sisay-Sabally =

Gambian lawyer

Attorney General Minister of Justice
- In office April 1996 – 31 July 1998
- President: Yahya Jammeh
- Preceded by: Fafa Edrissa M'Bai
- Succeeded by: Fatou Bensouda

Personal details
- Spouse: Ousman Sabally
- Parent: Biram Sisay

Hawa Sisay-Sabally is a Gambian lawyer who served as Attorney General from 1996 to 1998 and has since spoken out against corruption in The Gambia and represented opposition politicians in criminal cases regarding their participation in pro-democracy protests.

== Early life and education ==
Sisay-Sabally's father was former Minister of Trade and Finance Sheriff Saikouba Sisay.

== Career ==
Sisay-Sabally was appointed as Minister of Justice and Attorney General under President Yahya Jammeh in April 1996. She was replaced by Fatou Bensouda on 31 July 1998.

After the government approved a controversial Indemnity Act in 2001, allowing the President to shield people from prosecution, Sisay-Sabally spoke out against it as "tantamount to a coup against the 1997 constitution." The Act was passed to prevent the prosecution of security personnel for their roles in the deaths of 14 students in April 2000. Sisay-Sabally represented her husband in a case that went to the Supreme Court of the Gambia, which ruled that the act had been passed and retroactively applied to prevent his case and awarded him damages.

Sisay-Sabally is a member of the Female Lawyers Association of the Gambia, founded in 2007 to lobby for gender equality in The Gambia through legislative reform. She is also a member of Transparency International and of the Network of Lawyers for Defence of Journalists in West Africa and has spoken out against corruption in The Gambia. She is secretary to the Board of the Arab Gambian Islamic Bank.

In 2010, Sisay-Sabally represented Yussef Ezzeden, one of the accused in a treason trial involving former Chief of Defence Lang Tombong Tamba. In 2016, she was one of the lawyers representing United Democratic Party opposition politician Ousainou Darboe and others who were jailed for staging pro-democracy protests ahead of the 2016 presidential election.

== Personal life ==
Sisay-Sabally is married to Ousman Sabally, a school teacher, who she represented in 2001 after he was assaulted by state security agents.

== Publications ==
- Sisay Sabally, Hawa (1998). "Inheritance in the Gambia". In Akua Kuenyehia (ed.). Women and Law in West Africa: Situational Analysis of Some Key Issues Affecting Women. Legon.
- Sisay Sabally, Hawa (2004). National Integrity Systems: Transparency International Questionnaire The Gambia 2004 (PDF) (Report). Transparency International.
