= Amie Bensouda =

Gambian lawyer and politician

Amie Ndoungou Drammeh Bensouda
- Born: 9 July 1957 (age 69)
- Citizenship: Gambia
- Education: Bachelor of Law ( LLB) from the university of Nigeria, Nsukka
- Occupations: Gambia lawyer and politician
- Known for: First female solicitor general of the Gambia
- Notable work: Served as Attorney General and Minister of justice. Served as counsel to the Government divestiture and public enterprise reform program: Restructured several corporations and parastaltals for privatization Established her own law firm in 1995 Appointed chief of attorney for the Jammeh commission of Inquiry set up by the president in 2017
- Spouse: Ahmed Bensouda
- Children: Talib Ahmed Bensouda
- Parents: Alagie Seihou (father); Aji Mariama Jammeh (mother)

Amie Ndoungou Drammeh Bensouda (born 9 July 1957) is a Gambian lawyer and politician. She was the first female Solicitor General of the Gambia and served as Attorney General and Minister of Justice following the 1994 coup that brought Yahya Jammeh to power. Bensouda is a member of the London Institute of Chartered Arbitrators (CIArB) and a trained mediator. She was also two-term President of the Gambia Bar Association. She is the mother of the current mayor of KMC, Talib Ahmed Bensouda.

== Background and education ==
Bensouda was born on 9 July 1957 in Basse. Her father Alagie Seihou Drammeh is of Sabegi origin who settled in Bakau and her mother Aji Mariama Jammeh is from Bakindick. Bensouda attended the University of Nigeria, Nnsuka where she attained a Bachelor of Laws before proceeding to the Nigerian Law School and the Kenya School of Law where she qualified as a lawyer. She was called to the Nigerian and Gambian bars in 1981.

Bensouda was married to Ahmed Bensouda who was a ministerial advisor until the 1994 coup of Yahya Jammeh. She has several children with him including Talib Ahmed Bensouda who was elected Lord Mayor of Kanifing Municipality in 2018.

== Career ==
After being called to bar she joined the civil service and worked for fourteen years rising to the position of Solicitor General serving in this capacity as the Gambian first woman to hold this office from 1990 to 1995. Following the 1994 Yahya Jammeh coup, Bensouda was appointed acting Attorney General and Minister of Justice. During this period, she negotiated Paris Club debt relief. She was Chief Parliamentary Counsel, Legal Draftsperson, and Counsel for the privatization of State-owned enterprises and reform of parastatals. While serving as a counsel to the Government Divestiture and Public Enterprise Reform Program, Bensouda restructured several corporations and para-statals for privatization.

Bensouda established her own private law firm in 1995 acting as an arbitrator and mediator in commercial disputes and specializing in human rights. She defended Isatou Touray and Amie Bojang-Sissoho, members of the Gambia Committee on Traditional Practices Affecting the Health of Women and Children, during their 2010–2012 trial. She was also briefly detained in December 2012 because she acted as counsel for Imam Baba Leigh.

In 2017, she was appointed chief attorney for the Janneh Commission of Inquiry set up by the President Adama Barrow administration to investigate the financial transactions of President Yahya Jammeh.
