= Phillip Bridges =

British barrister and judge

Sir Phillip Bridges CMG QC

Chief Justice of the Gambia
- In office 1968–1983
- President: Sir Dawda Jawara
- Preceded by: Joseph Wiseham
- Succeeded by: Emmanuel Ayoola

Attorney General of the Gambia
- In office 1964–1968
- Prime Minister: Sir Dawda Jawara
- Succeeded by: Momadu Lamin Saho

Personal details
- Born: 9 July 1922 Bedford, England
- Died: 26 December 2007 (aged 85)

Military service
- Allegiance: United Kingdom
- Branch/service: British Army
- Years of service: c. 1940–1946
- Unit: Royal Artillery
- Battles/wars: World War II

Sir Phillip Rodney Bridges CMG QC (9 July 1922 – 26 December 2007) was a British barrister and judge, who latterly served as Chief Justice of the Gambia from 1968 to 1983.

== Early life ==
Bridges was born on 9 July 1922 near Bedford, the son of Sir Ernest Bridges, a commodore of Royal Mail Lines. He was educated at Bedford School.

== Military service ==
Bridges was commissioned into the Royal Artillery after he left school. He was attached to the Royal West African Frontier Force (RWAFF) and served with them in Burma. He fought in the Arakan Campaign, where he was involved in a five-month journey that involved crossing ten rivers. According to The Telegraph, he recalled one occasion when the man standing next to him was killed, and another where he escaped an ambush only to encounter the enemy again running in the opposite direction. He was demobilised in 1946.

== Legal career ==
After his military service, Bridges qualified as a solicitor in the United Kingdom. In 1954, he was posted to the Gambia Colony and Protectorate as a lands officer. He worked as Registrar General and Assistant Attorney General before becoming Solicitor General in 1963 and Attorney General in 1964. He helped draft the Gambian constitution prior to independence.

The Gambia became independent in 1965, but Bridges remained in his post until 1968. This was unusual for post-independence African countries and he was the only European in the Gambian cabinet after independence.

Bridges was appointed Chief Justice of the Gambia in 1968 and continued in this role until 1983. He earned a reputation for "fairness, tolerance, and above all, kindness." He learned the Wolof language while in the country. At one point, as Chief Justice, he reportedly earned the anger of Sir Dawda Jawara, the then President of the Gambia, for recalling Hugh Latimer's warning before being burned at the stake in 1555: "Corruption bringeth rebellion." He was described as "an anomaly of Gambian tolerance" by The New York Times in 1977.

Bridges was made a Queen's Counsel in 1964, was appointed CMG in 1967, and was knighted in 1973. He was also made an Honorary Commander of the National Order of The Republic of The Gambia (CRG) by Sir Dawda Jawara.

== Retirement and death ==
He retired to England in 1983 and became the representative of The Gambia Legion in the UK and an honorary legal advisor to the British Ex-Commonwealth Services League. He contributed a chapter to The Gambia's Studies in Politics and Society, published in 1991. He died in December 2007 in Suffolk. Writing in 2012, Hassan Bubacar Jallow said that Bridges' "sense of justice and fair play, his personal integrity and deep dedication to the Gambian people were never at any time in question during his long career."
