= Fafa Edrissa M'Bai =

Gambian politician (1942–2025)

Attorney General of the Gambia
- In office 11 May 1982 – June 1984
- Preceded by: M. L. Saho
- Succeeded by: Hassan Bubacar Jallow
- In office August 1994 – March 1995
- Preceded by: Hassan Bubacar Jallow
- Succeeded by: Hawa Sisay-Sabally

Personal details
- Born: 18 September 1942 Sambang, Niamina West, Gambia Colony and Protectorate
- Died: 26 March 2025 (aged 82)
- Party: PPP
- Education: Keele University; University of London
- Occupation: Lawyer and politician

Fafa Edrissa M'Bai (18 September 1942 – 26 March 2025) was a Gambian lawyer and politician who was a member of the People's Progressive Party, in which he served as Attorney General from 1982 to 1984 and again from 1994 to 1995.

M'Bai died on 26 March 2025, at the age of 82.
