= Mama Fatima Singhateh =

Gambian lawyer, judge, and politician

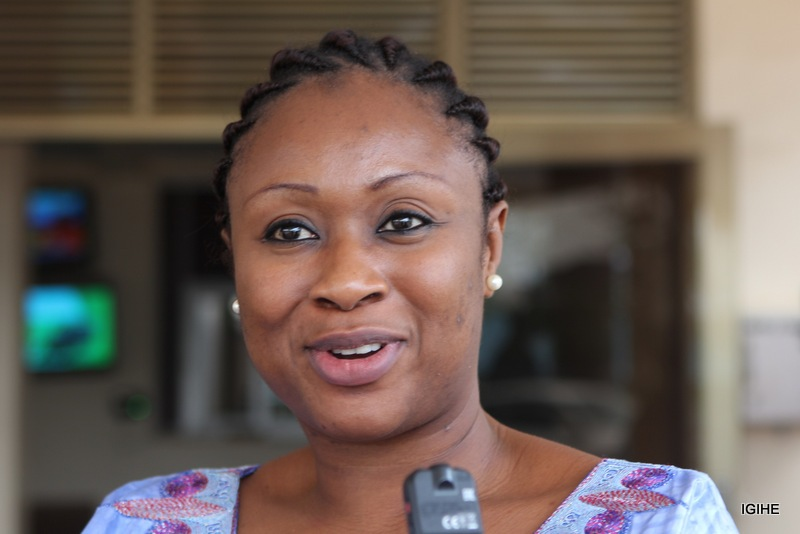

United Nations Special Rapporteur on the Sale and Sexual Exploitation of Children
- Incumbent
- Assumed office 13 March 2020
- Preceded by: Maud de Boer-Buquicchio

Minister of Justice Attorney General
- In office 12 January 2015 – 17 January 2017
- President: Yahya Jammeh
- Preceded by: Basiru Mahoney
- Succeeded by: Ba Tambadou
- In office 27 August 2013 – 27 August 2014
- President: Yahya Jammeh
- Preceded by: Amie Joof
- Succeeded by: Basiru Mahoney

Personal details
- Education: University of Hull; University of Wales

Mama Fatima Singhateh (born October 1, 1974) is a Gambian lawyer, judge, and politician. Between 2009 and 2013, she was a judge in the High Court, then at the Court of Appeal of The Gambia. She subsequently served as Minister of Justice and Attorney General of the Gambia from 2013 to 2014, and again from 2015 to 2017. She currently serves as the United Nations Special Rapporteur on the Sale and Sexual Exploitation of Children.

== Early life and education ==
Singhateh had her basic and secondary-school educations in Banjul, The Gambia. She received an LLB (Hons) degree from the University of Hull, United Kingdom in 1997, and a Masters in International Business Law there in 1998. Between 1998 and 1999 she completed the Bar Vocational Course at the University of Wales and was called to the Bar of England and Wales as Barrister.

== Professional career ==
Before her appointment as Minister, Singhateh held several positions within the Attorney General's Chambers of The Gambia—as State Counsel in 2002, as Senior State Counsel, and as Principal Drafts person. Between 2007 and 2009 Singhateh branched into the private sector, where she headed the legal department at an international bank. She was then appointed Judge of the High Court of The Gambia.

== Judicial career ==
In August 2009, on the recommendation of the Judicial Service Commission, Singhateh was appointed Judge of the High Court by President Yaya Jammeh. She was then elevated to the Gambia Court of Appeal in 2012, where she served until her appointment as Minister of Justice. While at the Judiciary Justice, she was the project coordinator of the UNDP Justice Sector project.

== Political appointments ==
In August 2013 Singhateh was appointed to the Cabinet of the Government of The Gambia to occupy the position of Attorney General and Minister of Justice. During her ministry the Ministry's premises were refurbished, and the Single Business Window Registry was launched. In 2015 her ministry spearheaded amendments in the Sexual Offences Act, outlawing the practice of female genital mutilation in the Gambia. A year later, she led legislative efforts that resulted in the historical outlawing of child marriages in The Gambia. She was relieved of her appointment as Minister of Justice in August 2014. In January 2015 she was reappointed Attorney General and Minister of Justice, positions which she held until 17 January 2017.

== United Nations Special Rapporteur on the Sale and Sexual Exploitation of Children ==
In March 2020, the United Nations Human Rights Council appointed Singhateh the UN Special Rapporteur on the Sale and Sexual Exploitation of Children, replacing Maud de Boer-Buquicchio who had held the position since May 2014.
