= Mabel Agyemang =

Chief Justice of The Turks and Caicos Islands

Her Ladyship Justice: Mabel Maame Agyemang
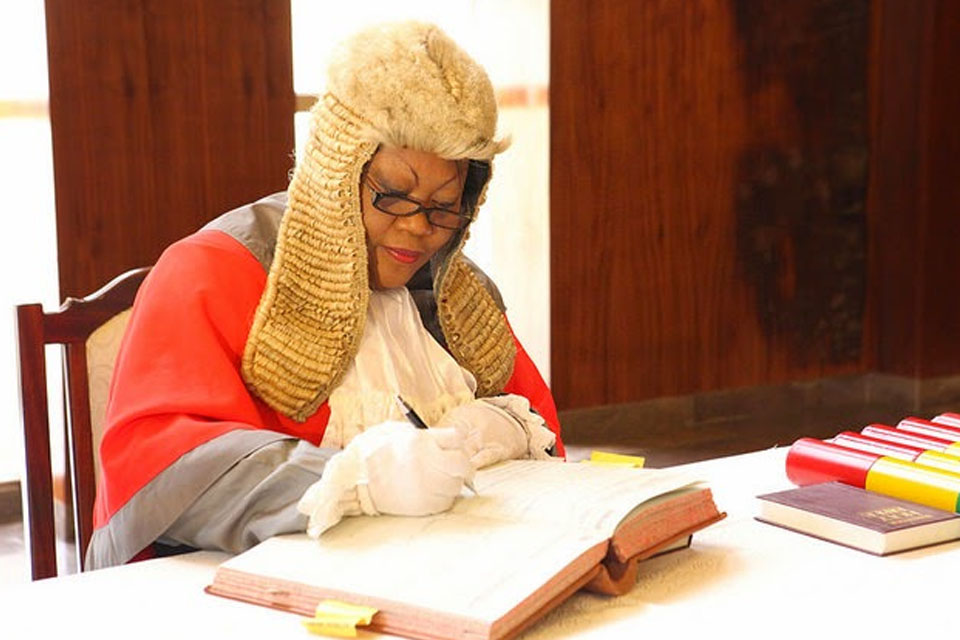

Chief Justice of the Turks and Caicos Islands
- Incumbent
- Assumed office 1 April 2020
- Preceded by: Margaret Ramsay-Hale

Chief Justice of The Gambia
- In office 1 August 2013 – 3 February 2014
- Preceded by: Joseph Wowo
- Succeeded by: Ali Nawaz Chowhan

Personal details
- Born: Mabel Betty Banful Ghana
- Education: Ghana School of Law; University of Ghana; Wesley Girls' High School
- Occupation: Judge
- Profession: Lawyer, Judge

Mabel Maame Agyemang (née Banful; formerly also Yamoa) is the current Chief Justice of the Turks and Caicos Islands. An expert superior court judge with a judicial career spanning decades, Agyemang served in the judiciaries of the governments of Ghana, The Gambia and Eswatini prior to her current role in the Turks and Caicos Islands. She was also the first female Chief Justice of The Gambia.

== Early life and education ==
Agyemang had her secondary school education at Wesley Girls Senior High School in Cape Coast. She attended the University of Ghana and then furthered her education at the Ghana School of Law (Professional Law Course).

== Judicial career ==
Justice Agyemang was called to the Ghanaian Bar in 1987 and joined the Bench shortly after. As a Ghanaian judge, she served in various judicial capacities and sat in a number of jurisdictions including Accra, Cape Coast, Koforidua, Kumasi, and Tema. She also served as vice-president of the Association of Magistrates and Judges of Ghana from 1996 to 2000. She was elevated to the High Court in 2002.

=== Commonwealth Secretariat Judge ===
She began working for the Commonwealth Secretariat as an expert judge in 2004, first being sent to The Gambia where she spent four years as a High Court judge. During her four-year tenure in The Gambia, Justice Agyemang served the Land, Civil, Commercial and Criminal divisions and successfully completed about 365 files. In 2008, she was seconded to Eswatini where she served for two years in a similar capacity. Her cases in Eswatini spanned both private and public law and included cases on defamation, unlawful arrests, police brutality and electoral disputes. One of her notable judgments in Eswatini was her judgment on the right to free education. Justice Agyemang returned to The Gambia in 2010, still with the Commonwealth Secretariat, as an expert Appeal Court judge.

=== Chief Justice of The Gambia ===
She was appointed Chief Justice of The Gambia in August 2013. Her appointment was widely seen as an inspired choice as she is seen by the international community as an experienced and independent minded judge. She served until her abrupt removal in February 2014. There was no official reason given by the Gambian government as to the cause of dismissal. It is suspected by many in the international judicial community that her dismissal was tied to differences over a human rights abuse case and her insistence on judicial independence.

=== Back to Ghana (Court of Appeal) ===
Upon returning to her native Ghana, Justice Agyemang was sworn in as a Justice of the Court of Appeal. In October 2015, while speaking at the opening ceremony of a new judicial complex in Accra, Ghanaian President John Dramani Mahama cited Justice Agyemang as an example of highly respected judges within the Ghanaian judiciary.

=== Chief Justice of the Turks and Caicos Islands ===
In February 2020, Nigel Dakin, Governor of the Turks and Caicos Islands, announced the appointment of Justice Agyemang as Chief Justice of the Turks and Caicos Islands. In his announcement speech, Governor Dakin noted of Agyemang's sudden departure from The Gambia in 2014:

It is worth saying something about her departure from her role in The Gambia. This is a badge of significant honour. She stood up to an autocrat — one of Africa's most notorious strongmen — Yahya Jammeh — whose 22-year rule only ended in 2017. Through integrity and courage, she attempted to protect the Judiciary from an overarching executive.

He went on to relay, as he stated, "evidence provided by the Bar Council in The Gambia", of her value and influence in the role:

During her tenure as Chief Justice, she had firm control of the judiciary, as well as the support of the judges, the Bar Association and the judicial staff. She instilled a culture of discipline and professionalism in the Judiciary. The attitude to work by judicial officers dramatically changed, and they became more professional and effective. Punctuality was expected of everyone and she led by example. She introduced reforms to ensure access to justice to litigants and to minimize the unnecessary delays in the dispensation of justice. She initiated the amendment of the Rules of Court to ensure expeditious determination of cases. She was a driver of innovation and reform, introducing ICT solutions to Judges for case law research amongst other things.

It was regrettable that despite her excellent and successful tenure, the President at the time unlawfully terminated her services to the dismay and disappointment of the entire legal fraternity. At that period of time, the then autocratic President was doing everything possible to control the Judiciary. Indeed, the departure of Justice Mabel Agyemang was sorely felt, as she left an indelible mark in our judicial sector.

— Bar Council of The Gambia, in Nigel Dakin, "Governor Dakin announces new judicial appointments" (2020)

Justice Agyemang was sworn in as Chief Justice of the Turks and Caicos Islands on March 30, 2020, and took office on April 1, 2020.

== Personal life ==
Justice Agyemang is a devout Christian and is married with two children.

== See also ==
- Judiciary of Ghana
- Commonwealth Secretariat
