= Abdou Kareem Savage =

Gambian Chief Justice (c. 1946–2015)

Chief Justice of the Gambia
- Removed
- In office 22 February 2006 – 8 June 2009
- President: Yahya Jammeh
- Preceded by: Stephen Alan Brobbey
- Succeeded by: Akomaye Agim

Personal details
- Born: c. 1946 Gambia Colony and Protectorate
- Died: 27 August 2015 (aged 68–69)

Abdou Kareem Savage (born c. 1946 – 27 August 2015) was the Chief Justice of the Gambia from 22 February 2006 till 8 June 2009. He was the first Gambian judge to ever hold this position. He was preceded by Stephen Alan Brobbey and, when removed from office by President Yahya Jammeh in 2009, succeeded by Akomaye Agim.
