= Datti =

Datti is a Hausa masculine name common in Nigeria.

== Notable people with the name ==
- Yusuf Datti Baba-Ahmed, Nigerian politician
- Mohammed Aliyu Datti, Nigerian footballer
- Datti Abubakar, Military Governor of Anambra state
- Abubakar Datti Yahaya, Nigerian judge
