= Jizzle =

Jizzle may refer to:

- Jizzle (artist), Gambian Afropop singer
- Jizzle (book), by John Wyndham (1954)
- "Jizzle" (song), by Jeezy featuring Lil Jon (2010)
