= Gambia Independence Act 1964 =

Act of the Parliament of the United Kingdom

Gambia Independence Act 1964 (Note: Section 7.)
- Act of Parliament
- Parliament of the United Kingdom
- Long title: An Act to make provision for, and in connection with, the attainment by The Gambia of fully responsible status within the Commonwealth.
- Citation: 1964 c. 93
- Introduced by: Anthony Greenwood (Commons)
- Territorial extent: United Kingdom

Dates
- Royal assent: 17 December 1964
- Commencement: 18 February 1965 (Note: Section 1(1).)
Other legislation
Amended by	Finance Act 1969; Statute Law (Repeals) Act 1969; Republic of the Gambia Act 1970; Civil Aviation Act 1971; Statute Law (Repeals) Act 1977; Interpretation Act 1978; International Organisations Act 1981; British Nationality Act 1981; Copyright, Designs and Patents Act 1988; Merchant Shipping Act 1995; Commonwealth Act 2002; Armed Forces Act 2006

Status: Amended

Text of statute as originally enacted

Revised text of statute as amended

Text of the Gambia Independence Act 1964 as in force today (including any amendments) within the United Kingdom, from legislation.gov.uk.

The Gambia Independence Act 1964 (c. 93) is an act of the Parliament of the United Kingdom that gave independence to The Gambia with effect from 18 February 1965. The act also provided for the continued right of appeal from the Gambian courts to the Judicial Committee of the Privy Council, which was abolished in 1998 when Yahya Jammeh decided to reorganise the Gambian judiciary under the 1997 Constitution of The Gambia, which replaced the 1970 Constitution of The Gambia that had been suspended after the 1994 Gambian coup d'état on 22 July 1994.

== Marlborough House conference ==
On 23 July 1964, a conference was held at Marlborough House to make plans for Gambian independence. A high level delegation from The Gambia, led by Prime Minister Dawda Jawara, met with a British delegation led by Duncan Sandys, the Secretary of State for the Colonies. Sandys discussed an independent Gambia's need for financial assistance, a part he envisaged would be played by the British. However, Sandys also noted that independence 'was not all about money'.

=== Gambian attendees ===
- Dawda Jawara, Prime Minister of The Gambia
- Sheriff Sekouba Sisay, Minister of Finance
- Sheriff Mustapha Dibba
- Alieu Badara Njie, Minister of Works and Communication
- Amang Kanyi, Minister of Agriculture
- Seyfo Omar Mbakeh
- Kalilu Singhateh
- Famara Wassa Touray
- Alieu Ebrima Cham Joof
- Paul L. Baldeh
- Pierre Sarr N'Jie
- I. A. S. Burang John
- Kebba W. Foon
- I.M. Garba-Jahumpa
- Philip Bridges, Attorney General of The Gambia
- F. D. C. Williams
- K. J. W. Lane
- Rev. J. C. Faye
- Sir John Paul, Governor of The Gambia

=== British attendees ===
- Marquess of Lansdowne
- Sir John Martin
- J. M. Kirsch
- H. Steel
- R. G. Pettitt

== Bibliography ==
- Whitaker's Almanack: for the year 1966, complete edition, p. 321. J. Whitaker & Sons, London, 1965
