= Chief Justice of the Gambia =

Head of the Gambian judiciary

- Coat of arms of the Gambia

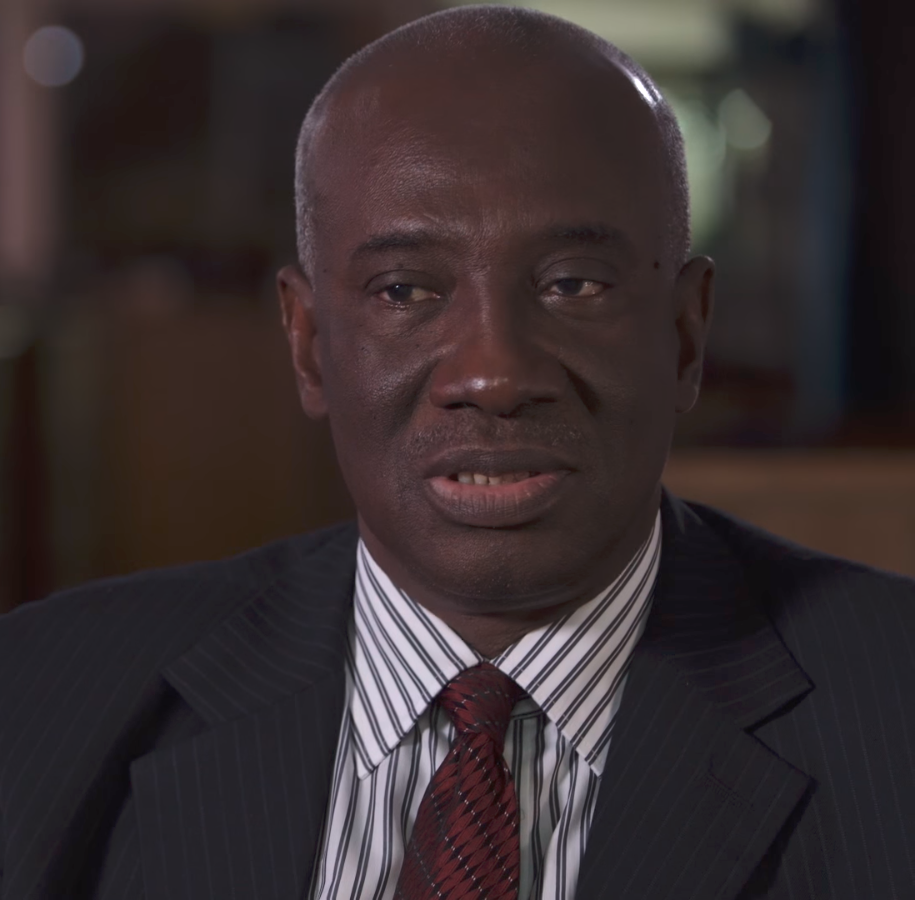
- Incumbent; Hassan Bubacar Jallow since 15 February 2017
- Appointer: President of the Gambia on advice of the Judicial Service Commission of The Gambia
- Inaugural holder: Richard Graves MacDonnell

The chief justice of the Gambia is the head of the Gambian judiciary and is responsible for the administration and supervision of the courts. The chief justice is also the chief judge of the Supreme Court of the Gambia.

Judges from other Commonwealth countries have served as chief justices of The Gambia, but the current chief justice is a native Gambian citizen.

== Role ==
=== Appointment and dismissal ===
Section 138 of the Constitution of the Gambia states that the chief justice is appointed by the president of the Gambia following consultation with the Judicial Service Commission. Under Section 140, if there is a vacancy in the office of Chief Justice, the next most senior judge on the Supreme Court of the Gambia acts in that role until the President makes a substantive appointment to replace the chief justice, which they must do within six months of the post becoming vacant.

According to Section 141, the chief justice "may only be removed from office for inability to perform the functions of his or her judicial office, whether arising from infirmity of body or mind, or for misconduct." This can only take place after a majority of National Assembly Members present a motion to the Speaker and a vote in the National Assembly on the motion has a majority of at least two-thirds. After this, a tribunal of three members, one of whom must have held high judicial office, investigates the matter. If they determine that whatever accusations are correct, the National Assembly must again vote, and if a two-thirds majority is again reached, the chief justice immediately ceases to hold office.

=== Duties ===
Under Section 64, the speaker of the National Assembly can request that the chief justice appoint a medical board to "enquire into the alleged mental or physical incapacity of the president to discharge the functions of his her office". If this does happen, until the medical board has concluded its report, the vice-president undertakes the duties of the office of the President. Under Section 67, the speaker can request that the chief justice appoints a tribunal to investigate claims of misconduct by the president if he has received a notice in writing signed by not less than half the National Assembly members.

It is the responsibility of the chief justice to preside over the election of a speaker, according to Section 93. Section 143 provides for the chief justice to "issue orders and directions for the proper and efficient operation of the courts", and in order to do this, they are supported by a judicial secretary.

The chief justice presides over sittings of the Supreme Court of the Gambia. They are also a member of the Cadi Appeals Selection Committee, according to Section 137 A (4), and chair of the Judicial Service Commission according to Section 145. In order to appoint people to the Judicial Service Commission, the president must consult with the chief justice.

== History ==
Richard Graves MacDonnell was named the first chief justice of the Gambia in 1843. Initially, in the colonial Gambia, the chief justice was, in fact, a chief magistrate, who presided over hearings of the Supreme Court of Judicature of the Gambia. The court held three sessions: the spring session during the first week of March, the summer session during the first week of July, and the autumn session during the third week of November. The court, at the time, had the same jurisdiction, authority and powers of the High Court of Justice did in England and Wales. In 1876, F. H. Spilsbury, the Colonial Surgeon, was appointed as acting Chief Magistrate.

== List of chief justices ==
Chief Justice	Tenure	Length of tenure	Appointed by	Prior position
Richard Graves MacDonnell (1814–1881)	20 July 1843 – 1 October 1847	4 years, 73 days	Henry Froude Seagram; Governor of the Gambia	Barrister-at-Law, Lincoln's Inn (1841–1843)
John Iles Mantell	1847 – 1867	19–20 years	Richard Graves MacDonnell; Governor of the Gambia	
Francis Smith (1847–1912)	1879 – 1887	7–8 years	Valesius Skipton Gouldsbury; Administrator of the Gambia	Barrister-at-Law, Middle Temple (1871–1879)
Edward Archibald Hume (1878–1915)	1909 – 1913	3–4 years	George Chardin Denton; Governor of the Gambia	Barrister-at-Law, Lincoln's Inn (1902–1909)
Joseph Wiseham	1957 – 1968	10–11 years	Percy Wyn-Harris; Governor of the Gambia	
Sir Phillip Bridges (1922–2007)	1968 – 1983	14–15 years	Dawda Jawara; Prime Minister of the Gambia (1962–1970); President of the Gambia (1970–1994)	Attorney General of the Gambia (1964–1968)
Emmanuel Ayoola (born 1933)	1983 – 1992	8–9 years	Dawda Jawara; Prime Minister of the Gambia (1962–1970); President of the Gambia (1970–1994)	Justice of the Court of Appeal of the Gambia (1980–1983)
Ibrahim A. Omoson	1992 – 1995	2–3 years	Dawda Jawara; Prime Minister of the Gambia (1962–1970); President of the Gambia (1970–1994)	
Omar H. Aghali	1995 – 1998	2–3 years	Yahya Jammeh; President of the Gambia	
Felix M. Lartey	1999 – 2001	1–2 years	Yahya Jammeh; President of the Gambia	
Muhammed Arif	2001 – 2003	1–2 years	Yahya Jammeh; President of the Gambia	Justice of the Supreme Court of Pakistan (1998–2002)
Stephen Alan Brobbey	31 July 2004 – 6 February 2006	1 year, 190 days	Yahya Jammeh; President of the Gambia	Justice of the Supreme Court of Ghana
Abdou Kareem Savage (died 2015)	22 February 2006 – 8 June 2009	3 years, 106 days	Yahya Jammeh; President of the Gambia	Justice of the Supreme Court of the Gambia
Akomaye Agim	2009 – 2013	3–4 years	Yahya Jammeh; President of the Gambia	Justice of the Supreme Court of the Gambia
Joseph Wowo	20 June 2013 – 19 July 2013	29 days	Yahya Jammeh; President of the Gambia	Justice of the Court of Appeal of the Gambia (2009–2013)
Mabel Agyemang	1 August 2013 – 3 February 2014	186 days	Yahya Jammeh; President of the Gambia	Justice of the Court of Appeal of the Gambia (2010–2013)
Ali Nawaz Chowhan	6 March 2014 – 12 May 2015	1 year, 67 days	Yahya Jammeh; President of the Gambia	Judge of the International Criminal Tribunal for the former Yugoslavia (2006–2009)
Emmanuel Fagbenle	13 May 2015 – 20 January 2017	1 year, 252 days	Yahya Jammeh; President of the Gambia	Justice of the Court of Appeal of the Gambia (2009–2015)
Hassan Bubacar Jallow (born 1951)	15 February 2017 – Incumbent	9 years, 204 days	Adama Barrow; President of the Gambia	Prosecutor of the Mechanism for International Criminal Tribunals (2012–2016)
