= Supreme Court of the Gambia =

Highest court in The Gambia

- Established: 1851
- Jurisdiction: The Gambia
- Location: Banjul
- Composition method: Presidential appointment following Judicial Service Commission recommendation
- Authorised by: Gambian Constitution
- Judge term length: Life tenure
- Number of positions: No less than 5

Chief Justice of the Gambia
- Currently: Hassan Bubacar Jallow
- Since: 15 February 2017

The Supreme Court of the Gambia is a superior court of record and the highest court in The Gambia. Established in 1851, it has appellate and original jurisdiction over any law exceeding the powers conferred by the Constitution or any law upon the National Assembly or any other person or authority.

== History ==
Established first in 1851, the Supreme Court was headed firstly by a Chief Justice and then later by a Judge. A Chief Justice was again appointed in 1957. It was initially the only court in The Gambia to have trial by jury, with the High Court having trial by judge alone. Appeals against Supreme Court decisions could be made to the West African Court of Appeal, and then to the Judicial Committee of the Privy Council. Following independence in 1965, this arrangement persisted, with the West African Court of Appeal being replaced by the Court of Appeal of The Gambia. The 1997 constitution made the Supreme Court the highest court in The Gambia, composed of a Chief Justice and no more than five other Justices.

Appeals to the Judicial Committee of the Privy Council were abolished in 1998.

Under Jammeh, Justices risked being dismissed after presiding over sensitive cases in the court. In 2003, Hassan Bubacar Jallow was dismissed after presiding over several high-profile cases in which provisions of National Assembly acts were invalidated for contravening the Constitution and the African Charter. Similarly, Raymond Sock and Gibou Janneh were dismissed in 2015 after moves to commute death sentences for accused conspirators to life sentences in prison.

Following the election of President Adama Barrow, the court held its first sitting in over two years, from 15 May 2017 to 9 June. During the sitting, they listened to 41 cases, a "historic pacesetting record".

== Jurisdiction ==
Section 126 sets out the jurisdiction of the court: the Supreme Court is the final court of appeal for The Gambia and also has appellate and other jurisdiction as defined by the Constitution. It does not have original jurisdiction in any criminal matter. The court may overrule a previous decision "when it appears right to do so", and all other courts are bound to follow the decisions of the Supreme Court on a matter of law. Section 67(2)(b) states that when the Speaker acts on a notification of misconduct by the President, he must appoint a tribunal led by the Chief Justice and consisting of other members who must have held high judicial office.

=== Original jurisdiction ===
The original jurisdiction of the court is set out in Section 127 of the Constitution. It lies with the interpretation or enforcement of any provisions of the Constitution, besides Sections 18 to 33 and Section 36(5); on any question of whether law was made in excess of the powers conferred by the Constitution or in other statutes; on any question of whether a person was validly elected to the presidency (Section 49) or the National Assembly; or on any question of whether the contents of an official document should be produced in court proceedings if national security issues are at stake.

=== Appellate jurisdiction ===
The Supreme Court has appellate jurisdiction in cases from a variety of sources, and this is set out in Section 128 of the Constitution. These include appeals from the Court of Appeal in any civil or criminal case or matter from a judgement in the High Court that was in the exercise of its original jurisdiction; an appeal from the Court of Appeal that dismissed an appeal from a death sentence imposed by another court; or in any such case as prescribed by an act of the National Assembly. An appeal may also reach the Supreme Court from the Court of Appeal if that court is satisfied that the case involves a substantial question of law or it is in the public interest that the matter be heard by the Supreme Court.

== Composition ==
=== Number ===
According to Section 125(1) of the Constitution, the Supreme Court must consist of the Chief Justice and not less than four other Justices of the Supreme Court. Overall, the Supreme Court must be constituted by an uneven number of not less than five judges.

=== Qualification and appointment ===
Under Section 139, a person is qualified to be appointed as a Justice of the Supreme Court if they have held office as a Judge of the Court of Appeal or a judge of a court with similar jurisdiction in a common law country, for not less than five years. Alternatively, if they have practiced as a lawyer before a court having unlimited jurisdiction in civil and criminal matters in a common law country for not less than 12 years. A person may be appointed as Chief Justice if they are qualified to be appointed as a Judge of the Supreme Court or have been a judge of a superior court of a common law country for not less than 10 years.

Section 138 states that the Chief Justice is appointed by the President after consultation with the Judicial Service Commission (JSC). Similarly, Justices are appointed by the President on the recommendation of the JSC. The appointments are validated by warrants signed by the President and sealed with the Public Seal. Before assuming office, Justices must take prescribed oaths.

Expatriate judges from other Commonwealth countries, especially from Nigeria and Sierra Leone, are usually appointed, but a Gambianisation process has been underway since Adama Barrow replaced Yahya Jammeh as President of the Gambia in January 2017.

=== Current members ===
| Name | Date of birth | Appointed by | Age at appointment | Current age | Length of service | Previous positions | | | | | |
|---|---|---|---|---|---|---|---|---|---|---|---|
| Hassan Bubacar Jallow (Chief Justice) | 14 August 1951; Bansang, Central River Division | Adama Barrow | 65 | 74 | 15 February 2017; 9 years, 4 months | Prosecutor of the Mechanism for International Criminal Tribunals (2012–2016); Prosecutor of the International Criminal Tribunal for Rwanda (2003–2015); Minister of Justice and Attorney General of the Gambia (1984–1994) | | | | | |
| Abubakar Datti Yahaya | 27 January 1952; Nigeria | Yahya Jammeh | 64 | 74 | 30 December 2016; 9 years, 5 months | Justice, Abuja Division, Court of Appeal of Nigeria (2008–present); Judge, High Court of Kaduna State | | | | | |
| Nicholas Colin Browne-Marke | 15 June 1957; Sierra Leone | Yahya Jammeh | 59 | 69 | 30 December 2016; 9 years, 5 months | Justice, Supreme Court of Sierra Leone (2014–present); Senior Justice, Court of Appeal of Sierra Leone (2007–2014); Private practice (1989–2007) | | | | | |
| Cherno Sulayman Jallow | 15 November 1962; Old Yundum, Kombo North, Western Division | Adama Barrow | 54 | 63 | 28 April 2017; 9 years, 1 month | Attorney General of the British Virgin Islands (1999–2007) | Gibril B. Semega-Janneh | The Gambia | Adama Barrow | 1 November 2017; 8 years, 7 months | Justice, Supreme Court of the Gambia (2008–2015) |
| Raymond Sock | 5 June 1946; The Gambia | Adama Barrow | 71 | 80 | 1 November 2017; 8 years, 7 months | Justice, Supreme Court of the Gambia (2012–2015); Director-General of the Gambia Law School (2011–2015); Minister of Justice and Attorney General of the Gambia (2005) | | | | | |
| Awa Bah | The Gambia | Adama Barrow | | | 1 August 2020; 5 years, 10 months | President of the Gambia Court of Appeal (2017–2020) | | | | | |
| Edrissa Fafa M'bai | 18 September 1942; Sambang, Niamina West, Central River Division | Adama Barrow | 77 | 83 | 1 August 2020; 5 years, 10 months | President of the Gambia Court of Appeal (2015–2016); Minister of Justice and Attorney General of the Gambia (1982–1984, 1994–1995) | | | | | |
