= Fagbenle =

Fagbenle is a surname. Notable people with the surname include:

- Daps (director) (Oladapo Fagbenle; born 1986), Nigerian-born British artist, director and athlete
- Emmanuel Fagbenle, Nigerian judge
- Luti Fagbenle, British actor, film producer and businessman
- O-T Fagbenle (born 1981), English actor, writer and director
- Temi Fagbenle (born 1992), British–American basketball player
