= Baddoo =

Baddoo is a Ghanaian surname. Notable people with the surname include:

- Akil Baddoo (born 1998), American baseball player
- Samuel Glenn Baddoo (born 1934), Ghanaian Supreme Court Judge
- Terry Baddoo, British television executive

== See also ==
- Badoo, a social network
