= Ali Nawaz =

Ali Nawaz may refer to:

- Ali Nawaz Awan, Pakistani politician
- Ali Nawaz Chowhan (died 2023), Pakistani judge
- Ali Nawaz Jung Bahadur (1877–?), Pakistani engineer
- Ali Nawaz Khan Mahar (born 1972), Pakistani politician
