= Seth Twum =

Ghanaian Supreme Court Judge (1937–2022)

Supreme Court Judge
- In office November 2002 – 20 March 2007
- Appointed by: John Kufuor

Personal details
- Born: Seth Twum; 20 March 1937
- Died: 15 July 2022 (aged 85)
- Education: Achimota School
- Profession: Judge

Seth Twum (20 March 1937 – July 2022) was a Ghanaian Supreme Court Judge. He served on the Supreme Court bench from 2002 to 2007.

== Biography ==
Twum was born on 20 March 1937. He had his secondary education at Achimota School.

He was nominated in July 2002 and was vetted in September that same year. A month later, he was approved by parliament and was sworn into office in November that year together with Justice Georgina Theodora Wood, Justice Stephen Alan Brobbey and Justice Samuel Glenn Baddoo by the then president John Agyekum Kufour. He retired on 20 March 2007 at the mandatory retirement age of seventy (70) years.

Twum died in July 2022, at the age of 85.

== See also ==
- List of judges of the Supreme Court of Ghana
- Supreme Court of Ghana
