= Solicitor General of the Gambia =

- Incumbent; Cherno Marenah since 2017
- Ministry of Justice
- Reports to: Attorney General
- Appointer: President of the Gambia

The Solicitor General of the Gambia is a senior government lawyer in the Gambia who serves as the second most senior official in the Ministry of Justice after the Attorney General/Minister of Justice. The incumbent Solicitor General is Cherno Marenah.

== Role ==
The Solicitor General is the deputy to the Attorney General, and has the authority to act on their behalf in their absence. The statutory basis for this authority in the Gambia is found in the Law Officers Act. In the Gambia, the Solicitor General also serves as the Legal Secretary, effectively the permanent secretary at the Ministry of Justice.

In his book, Journey for Justice, Hassan Bubacar Jallow noted that the office of Solicitor General is a "peculiarity of the English legal system and is of long vintage." He quotes from Chief Justice John Eardley Wilmot in 1770 who said that "the Solicitor General is the Secondarius attornatus; and as the Courts take notice judicially of the Attorney General when there is one, they take notice of the Solicitor General, as standing in his place, when there is none. He is a known and sworn officer of the crown, as much as the attorney; and, in the vacancy of that office, does every act, and executes every branch of it."

== List of Solicitors General ==
- Cherno Marenah, 2017–present
- Saffie Sankareh, 2016–2017
- Cherno Marenah, November 2014–May 2016
- Pa Harry Jammeh, 2010–2013
- Raymond Sock, 2000–2005
- Janet Ramatoulie Sallah-Njie, 1998–2000
- Fatou Bensouda, 1997–1998
- Amie N. D. Bensouda, 1990–1995
- Hassan Bubacar Jallow, 1982–1984
