= Gibril B. Semega-Janneh =

Gambian judge

Justice of the Supreme Court of the Gambia
- Incumbent
- Assumed office 1 November 2017
- President: Adama Barrow
- In office 2008–2015
- President: Yahya Jammeh

Personal details
- Born: Gibril Baboucarr Semega-Janneh

Gibril Baboucarr Semega-Janneh is a Gambian judge who currently serves as a Justice of the Supreme Court of the Gambia.

== Career ==
Janneh has served as a High Court judge in the Gambia, as well as a Court of Appeal judge. In 2005, he was appointed as a Fellow of Commonwealth Judicial Education Institute. He was serving as a judge in Sierra Leone on secondment in 2008. He served as a Justice of the Supreme Court from 2008 to 2015.He was re-appointed on 1 November 2017 by President Adama Barrow.
