= Gambian nationality law =

The Gambia Nationality and Citizenship Act

National Assembly of the Gambia
- Long title: The Gambia Nationality and Citizenship Act, No. 1/1965
- Enacted by: Government of The Gambia
- Status: Current legislation

Gambian nationality law is regulated by the Constitution of The Gambia, as amended; The Gambia Nationality and Citizenship Act, and its revisions; and various international agreements to which the country is a signatory. These laws determine who is, or is eligible to be, a national of The Gambia. The legal means to acquire nationality, formal legal membership in a nation, differ from the domestic relationship of rights and obligations between a national and the nation, known as citizenship. Nationality describes the relationship of an individual to the state under international law, whereas citizenship is the domestic relationship of an individual within the nation. Gambian nationality is typically obtained under the principle of jus sanguinis, born to parents with Gambian nationality. It can be granted to persons with an affiliation to the country, or to a permanent resident who has lived in the country for a given period of time through naturalization.

== Acquisition of nationality ==
Nationality can be acquired in The Gambia at birth or later in life through naturalization.

=== By birth ===
Those who acquire nationality at birth include:

- Children born anywhere who have at least one parent who is a national of Gambian origin. (Note: Children born abroad cannot automatically pass on their nationality to their offspring.)

=== By naturalization ===
Naturalization can be granted to persons who have resided in the territory of The Gambia for a sufficient period of time to confirm they understand the customs and traditions of the society. General provisions are that applicants have good character and conduct; are able to economically support themselves and their family; and intend to permanently reside in the territory. Applicants must typically have resided in the country for fifteen years. The law makes no provision for children adopted by Gambians, or children who live in the Gambia, but whose parents are unknown. Renunciation of other nationality is required for applicants to receive Gambian nationality. Besides foreigners meeting the criteria, other persons who may be naturalized include:

- The spouse of a Gambian national after seven years of residency; or
- Minor children can be automatically naturalised when their parent acquires nationality.

== Loss of nationality ==
Gambian nationals can renounce their nationality pending approval by the state. Nationals may be denaturalised in The Gambia for performing acts, like voting, which are afforded to citizens of another country; committing serious crimes; committing crimes against the state or state security; or for fraud, misrepresentation, or concealment in a naturalization petition. Persons who previously had nationality and wish to repatriate if they lost their status because of dual nationality are permitted to naturalise.

== Dual nationality ==
Dual nationality has been allowed in The Gambia since 2001 for Gambians born in The Gambia. Naturalised persons are not allowed to have other nationalities. The president of the country is required to be of Gambian descent.

== Commonwealth citizenship ==
Gambian citizens are also Commonwealth citizens as well.

== History ==
=== European period (1493–1821) ===
The papal bull Romanus Pontifex issued by Pope Nicholas V confirmed Portugal's exclusive right to the west coast of Africa, which was reconfirmed in the Inter caetera issued in 1493 by Pope Alexander VI. After the death of King Henry in 1580, Portugal suffered a succession crisis. António, Prior of Crato was one of the claimants to the throne and to raise money to support his claim and pay his debts, he sold the exclusive rights for ten years to trade along the Senegal and Gambia Rivers, to Anthony Dassell, a London merchant operating on the Barbary Coast, and a group of merchants from Barnstaple, Colyton, Exeter and London for £400. (Note: Richard Hakluyt lists them as Richard Doderige of Barnstaple; John Young of Colyton; William Brayley, John Doricot, Gilbert Smith, and Nicolas Spicer of Exeter; and Anthonie Dassell and Nicolas Turner of London.) Queen Elizabeth of England confirmed by letters patent the grant on 3 May 1588. Even after Philip II claimed the Portuguese throne, António continued to put forth that he owned the banks of the rivers in Senegambia, though the Portuguese settlers in the area strongly opposed the infringement of their trade monopoly. When the agreed-to term expired a decade later, Elizabeth granted a trade monopoly along the Gambia River to Charles Howard, 1st Earl of Nottingham and John Stanhope, 1st Baron Stanhope in January 1598, which was granted in 1618, by James I to Robert Rich, 1st Earl of Warwick and a consortium of London merchants. Rich and his partners founded the Company of Adventurers of London and founded Fort James on James Island, the first British settlement in the Gambia. By 1620 British settlements had expanded upriver and inland, to a village named Oranto, which was later known as Tobabkunda, but their venture failed by 1624 and subsequent explorers focused on the areas which would become the Gold Coast.

In 1621, the Dutch acquired Gorée island to establish a base in Senegambia for the Dutch East India Company. In 1631, Charles I extended the commercial charter to another British trading and colonizing conglomerate, and his successor Charles II of England granted another in 1651. Two expeditions were sent and a British trading post was founded at Bintang in 1652. Also in 1651, Jacob Kettler, Duke of Courland, in present-day Latvia, purchased James Island (known then as St. Andrew's Island) and land concessions at Banyon Point (now Half Die), Jufureh, and Kassang Hill (aka Gassan). He established a fort on the island and another at Banyon Point, sending colonists and missionaries to found permanent settlements. During the Polish-Swedish War, Kettler was imprisoned in Sweden in 1658, and in 1659 the Dutch agreed to take over Kettler's properties in The Gambia and in Tobago until he was released. In 1660, a French privateer captured the fort and plundered the island. The Dutch recaptured it, but then retreated to their stronghold at Gorée. The following year, British explorers retook the fort, and reinstated the name Fort James.

By 1662, the Dutch had taken the original Portuguese settlements in Africa and the Americas and conflict escalated into war between Britain and the Netherlands. Reinforcements were sent to Fort James and the British were able to take all of the Dutch forts in the region except the ones at Axim and Elmina. At the conclusion of the war in 1667, under terms of the Treaty of Breda, each side primarily retained what was in their possession and the British agreed to accept the Dutch principle of free trade. Conflict with the French followed with both sides capturing possessions of the other and then recapturing their former possessions. By 1749, the British had nine settlements in The Gambia. Between 1660 and 1752, the Royal Adventurers of England Trading to Africa, which became the Royal African Company in 1672, maintained the presence at Fort James. Then from 1750 to 1821, the Company of Merchants Trading to Africa based from the island. The British territories in the Gambia were acquired and lost multiple times to the French over the next one hundred years, though per the 1783 Treaty of Versailles British ownership was confirmed. In 1816, British Army captain, Alexander Grant negotiated a land cession from the Kombo chieftain on Banjul Island. He established the British town of Bathurst on St. Mary's Island and constructed barracks, government buildings, and harbor facilities.

=== British period (1821–1965) ===
In 1821, the British government took over the administration of the Gambia from the Company of Merchants. The new Crown Colony was administered from Bathurst until 1829, when Gambian administration was placed within the Colony of Sierra Leone. Between 1843 and 1866 the Gambia was a separate colony and then rejoined with Sierra Leone until 1888. In 1888, the Gambia again became a separate colony. Between 1890 and 1901 the administrator negotiated with local chieftainships for the cession of additional territory along the Gambia River. In 1902, Bathurst and Kombo St. Mary were established as the Gambia Colony and the other territories formed the Gambia Protectorate. Both were administered by the Governor of the Gambia Colony and Protectorate. In Britain, allegiance, in which subjects pledged to support a monarch, was the precursor to the modern concept of nationality. The crown recognised from 1350 that all persons born within the territories of the British Empire were subjects. Those born outside the realm — except children of those serving in an official post abroad, children of the monarch, and children born on a British sailing vessel — were considered by common law to be foreigners. Marriage did not affect the status of a subject of the realm. Nationality laws passed by the British Parliament were extended only to the Kingdom of Great Britain, and later the United Kingdom of Great Britain and Ireland. When British protectorates were established in 1815, there was little difference between the rights of British subjects and protected persons.

==== Persons in the Gambia Colony and British-born subjects living in the Gambia Protectorate (1914–1965) ====
In 1911, at the Imperial Conference a decision was made to draft a common nationality code for use across the empire. The British Nationality and Status of Aliens Act 1914 allowed local jurisdictions in the self-governing Dominions to continue regulating nationality in their territories, but also established an imperial nationality scheme throughout the realm. The uniform law, which went into effect on 1 January 1915, required a married woman to derive her nationality from her spouse, meaning if he was British, she was also, and if he was foreign, so was she. It stipulated that upon loss of nationality of a husband, a wife could declare that she wished to remain British and provided that if a marriage had terminated, through death or divorce, a British-born national who had lost her status through marriage could reacquire British nationality through naturalisation without meeting a residency requirement. The statute reiterated common law provisions for natural-born persons born within the realm on or after the effective date. By using the word person, the statute nullified legitimacy requirements for jus soli nationals. For those born abroad on or after the effective date, legitimacy was still required, and could only be derived by a child from a British father (one generation), who was natural-born or naturalised. Naturalisations required five years residence or service to the crown.

Amendments to the British Nationality Act were enacted in 1918, 1922, 1933 and 1943 changing derivative nationality by descent and modifying slightly provisions for women to lose their nationality upon marriage. Because of a rise in statelessness, a woman who did not automatically acquire her husband's nationality upon marriage or upon his naturalisation in another country, did not lose their British status after 1933. The 1943 revision allowed a child born abroad at any time to be a British national by descent if the Secretary of State agreed to register the birth. Under the terms of the British Nationality Act 1948 British nationals in The Gambia Colony were reclassified at that time as "Citizens of the UK and Colonies" (CUKC). The basic British nationality scheme did not change overmuch, and typically those who were previously defined as British remained the same. Changes included that wives and children no longer automatically acquired the status of the husband or father, children who acquired nationality by descent no longer were required to make a retention declaration, and registrations for children born abroad were extended.

==== Indigenous persons (British Protected Persons) in the Gambia Protectorate (1914–1965) ====
British protectorates, in 1914, were considered to be foreign territories lacking an internal government. When Britain extended this status over a territory, it took responsibility for both internal and external administration, including defense and foreign relations. Indigenous persons who were born in a protectorate were known as British Protected Persons (BPP) and were not entitled to be British nationals. BPPs had no right of return to the United Kingdom and were unable to exercise rights of citizenship; however, they could be issued a passport and could access diplomatic services when traveling abroad. In 1914, the Alien Restriction Act clarified that while BPPs were not nationals, neither were they aliens. When the law was amended in 1919, that provision remained the same, meaning that BPPs could not naturalise. Until 1934, when the British Protected Persons Order was drafted, the status of BPP was not statutory, but rather granted at the prerogative of the monarch. Under the 1934 Order, Belonger status with regard to protected territories was defined to mean persons born before or after the Order in a protectorate who possessed no nationality and were not a British subject, or persons born abroad to a native of a protectorate who were stateless and not British subjects. The statute extended BPP status to children and wives of BPPs, if they were stateless, and specifically provided that if a woman married someone who was a national of another nation, she lost her BPP status.

In 1943, the British Nationality Act clarified that BPPs born abroad in territories that were within the Crown's dominions were British subjects by virtue of jus soli, but those born within a protectorate were not subjects. Under the terms of the British Nationality Act 1948, BPPs of the Gambia Protectorate status did not change. However, the Act, while retaining the provisions that BPPs were not aliens and could not naturalise, allowed BPPs to register as BPP of a protected place or as a British subject under certain conditions. In 1949, the British Protectorates, Protected States and Protected Persons Order in Council repealed former orders about BPPs and detailed provisions for conferring protected status. It provided that protected persons were BPPs of a protectorate if they were born there; if they were born abroad to a father who was a native of a protectorate; or if at the time of their birth their father was a BPP. It also allowed women married to BPPs to register as a BPP and allowed certain nationals of foreign countries to register as BPPs. Minor changes to protected persons' status were made by Orders of Council in 1952, 1953, 1958, 1960, 1961, and 1962, but major changes did not occur until 1965.

Under the 1965 Order, the provisions of the 1949 order were retained, but new provisions for BPPs at birth included as BPPS, persons who would, except for the death of their father, have become BPPs; persons born aboard a ship or aircraft registered in a protectorate or unregistered but owned by the government of a protectorate; and foundlings discovered in a protectorate. In addition, stateless persons born prior to 28 January 1949 were allowed to register as BPPs if either of their parents were, or would have been except for death, BPPs on that date. Stateless persons born after that date could register if their parents were BPPs at the time of the child's birth. The Gambia Colony and Gambia Protectorate terminated on 18 February 1965, when The Gambia became an independent nation.

=== Post-independence (1965–present) ===
Those who gained nationality and ceased to be British subjects on Independence Day were any person born in The Gambia on or before 17 February 1965 who had been either a CUKC or BPP of The Gambia, except persons who neither had a parent or grandparent born in The Gambia. Persons who had been registered or naturalised in the Colony were also granted Gambian nationality. It also conferred nationality upon women who were married to Gambian nationals or whose spouse would have become a Gambian national except for his death. The 1965 Constitution allowed children to only acquire nationality through their father. It allowed foreigners to naturalise after completing a residency of five years and wives of Gambian nationals to acquire the nationality of their spouse by registration. Subsequent to independence, the Gambia enacted the Nationality and Citizenship Act of 1965. The 1970 Constitution changed the form of government from a monarchy to a republic, but retained the same nationality provisions. Under the 1997 Constitution of The Gambia children were able to derive nationality from either parent. The changes that year also allowed both foreign husbands and wives to acquire nationality by marriage to a Gambian spouse after a seven-year residency. A provision in the 1997 Constitution allowed for foundlings to derive Gambian nationality, but a constitutional amendment in 2001 removed the provision. The 2001 amendment allowed persons born, but not those naturalised in The Gambia to have other nationalities.

In 2010, President Yahya Jammeh proclaimed, without making legal provisions, that Black African descents willing to settle in The Gambia could acquire Gambian nationality. Approximately 100 persons relocated to the territory, but have been unable to acquire nationality. In 2017, a new constitution was drafted which was submitted in 2020 to the National Assembly, after public consultation. Its provisions would have allowed adoptees to gain nationality from their Gambian parents, equalised requirements for children born anywhere to Gambian parents (or who had one native Gambian grandparent), reduced the residency period for foreigners married to Gambians to five years, allow naturalised persons to keep other nationality, and provided nationality to foundlings and orphans under eight years old whose parents were unknown. The proposal did not receive the requisite three-quarters support from the legislators to allow it to formally be approved and submitted to a referendum.
