= Kachikally Museum and Crocodile Pool =

Museum & Crocodile Pool

The Kachikally crocodile pool
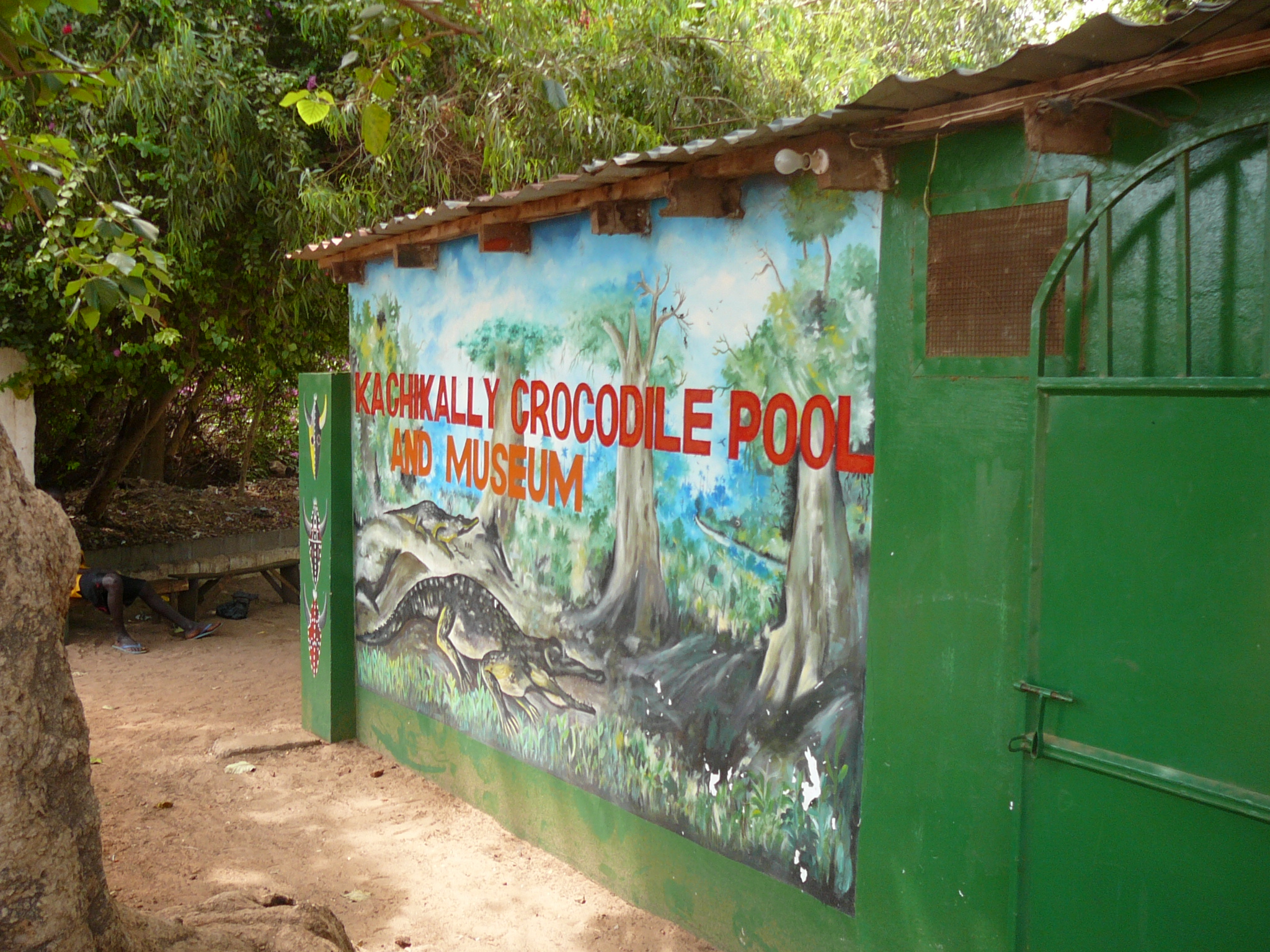
- Kachikally crocodile pool and museum entrance

- Location within The Gambia
- Location: Bakau, Gambia
- Coordinates: 13°28′36″N 16°40′21″W
- Owners: Bojang family of Bakau, one of the founding families and major land owners of the city.

The Kachikally crocodile pool is located in the heart of Bakau, Gambia, about 10 miles (16km) from the capital Banjul. It is one of three sacred crocodile pools used as sites for fertility rituals. The others are Folonko in Kombo South and Berending on the north bank.

== Ownership ==
Kachikally is a privately owned crocodile pool belonging to the Bojang family of Bakau, one of the founding families and major land owners of the city. Kachikally is also the name of the central district of Bakau town; other districts are Sanchaba and New Town, Mile 7, Farrokono.

== Crocodiles ==
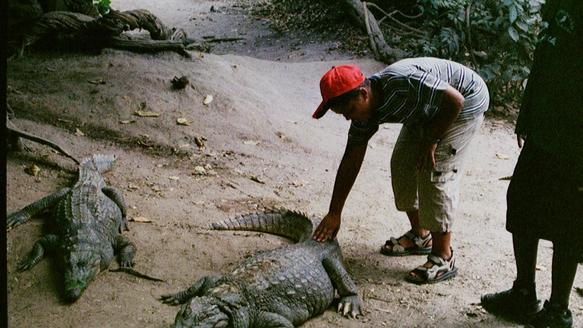
Visitors are able to touch the crocodiles

The exact number of crocodiles is not known but it is estimated that there are about 80. It was long claimed that all the animals are Nile crocodiles (Crocodylus niloticus), but research suggests they are a different species, namely the West African crocodile (Crocodylus suchus). There have been reports of the presence of albino crocodiles. Crocodiles are allowed to roam freely, and can be approached and touched by visitors. Crocodiles found in the wild are sometimes taken to and reared at the holy pools.
