= Amie Joof =

Minister for Justice and Attorney General of the Gambia
- In office 25 May 2013 – 27 August 2013
- President: Yahya Jammeh
- Preceded by: Lamin Jobarteh
- Succeeded by: Mama Fatima Singhateh

Personal details
- Party: Alliance for Patriotic Reorientation and Construction

Amie Joof Conteh is a Gambian lawyer and politician.

== Biography ==
Joof initially worked as a lawyer and was married to Abdoulie Conteh, who was mayor of Kanifing Municipal Council between 1994 and 2006. She represented him in court on several occasions.

After working as a lawyer, she was a judge at the High Court. In April 2012, she was appointed a judge at the Court of Appeal.

At the end of May 2013, President Yahya Jammeh appointed her Attorney General and Minister of Justice of the Gambia, succeeding Lamin Jobarteh, who had been dismissed earlier that year. Joof herself was dismissed on 27 August 2013, after only 14 weeks in office, and was succeeded by Mama Fatima Singhateh. These changes were part of a series of ministerial replacements within a short period.

After leaving her position as minister, she resumed her work as a lawyer. She is a member of the Female Lawyers Association Gambia (FLAG).
