= Basiru Mahoney =

Basiru V P Mahoney

Judge of the Court of Appeal of The Gambia
- In office 6 November 2020 – Present
- Appointed by: Adama Barrow

Minister of Justice Attorney General
- In office 27 August 2014 – 9 January 2015
- President: Yahya Jammeh
- Preceded by: Mama Fatima Singhateh
- Succeeded by: Mama Fatima Singhateh

Solicitor General & Legal Secretary
- In office 24 May 2013 – 27 August 2014
- President: Yahya Jammeh
- Preceded by: Pa Harry Jammeh
- Succeeded by: Cherno Marenah

Basiru V.P. Mahoney is a Gambian lawyer, politician and judge who served as Attorney General of The Gambia from 27 August 2014 to 9 January 2015. He previously served as the Solicitor General and Legal Secretary between May 2013 and August 2014 and as a Judge of the High Court between 2009 and 2013. Basiru Mahoney currently serves as a Judge of the Court of Appeal of The Gambia.

== Early life and education ==
Basiru Mahoney was born in Cape Point, The Gambia and did his primary and secondary education in Marina School Banjul and Gambia High School. Upon completing his O' levels he proceeded to the United Kingdom where he did the Bar vocational course and qualified to practice as a Barrister in England and Wales and subsequently in The Gambia in 2002.

== Professional career ==
Basiru Mahoney engaged in private practice in The Gambia before his appointment to the bench as a Magistrate. He would later be promoted to the High Court in 2009 and served there until his appointment as Solicitor General in May 2013. In an August 2014 cabinet reshuffle he was appointed Attorney General and Minister of Justice, a position he held until January 2015. Basiru Mahoney is currently a Judge of the Court of Appeal of The Gambia.

== The Mahoney Commission ==
In 2010 following complaints of corruption and a lack of transparency in the allocation of land in the country, President Yahya Jammeh appointed Basiru Mahoney to chair a Presidential Commission of Inquiry into land allocation in The Gambia. The Commission heard public testimony for 7 months and presented its report to the President on 23 June 2011. The inquiry uncovered illegal sales and allocations of land and led to major reforms in the land allocation system in The Gambia.
