= Samuel Glenn Baddoo =

Supreme Court Judge

Supreme Court Judge
- In office October 2002 – 3 March 2004
- Appointed by: John Kufuor

Personal details
- Born: Samuel Glenn Baddoo; 12 March 1934 (age 92)
- Profession: Judge

Samuel Glenn Baddoo is a retired Ghanaian Supreme Court Judge. He served on the Supreme Court bench from 2002 to 2004.

== Biography ==
Baddoo was born on 3 March 1934.

He was nominated for the office of Supreme Court Judge in July 2002 and was vetted together with Justice Stephen Alan Brobbey on 26 September that same year. A month later he was approved by parliament and was sworn into office in November that year together with Justice Georgina Theodora Wood, Justice Stephen Alan Brobbey and Justice Seth Twum by the then president John Agyekum Kufour. He retired on 3 March 2004 at the mandatory retirement age of seventy (70) years.

== See also ==
- List of judges of the Supreme Court of Ghana
- Supreme Court of Ghana
