= William Richard Townsend =

British lawyer (died 1914)

William Richard Townsend (died 1914) was a British lawyer who served with the Colonial Service in the Gambia and Sierra Leone in the early 20th century.

== Early life and education ==
Townsend was born the son of Edward and Judith Townsend. He graduated with a bachelor of laws from Trinity College, Dublin.

== Legal career ==
Townsend was appointed as Attorney General of the Gambia on 1 May 1902, the first in the colony's history. He was appointed to the Executive and Legislative Councils of the Gambia on 26 September 1902. He was appointed as Chief Magistrate of the Gambia on 18 January 1907, and as a judge in Sierra Leone on 22 October 1908. He was appointed as a circuit judge but also a puisne judge on its Supreme Court. He was appointed as the Attorney General of the Gold Coast on 16 November 1912.

== Personal life ==
Townsend married Emily Mabel Townshend in 1907. She was the daughter of Richard Horatio Townshend and Frances Maria Maunsell. He died in 1914, killed at sea.
