= Hassan Bubacar Jallow =

Gambian politician and lawyer

Hassan B. Jallow, CRG
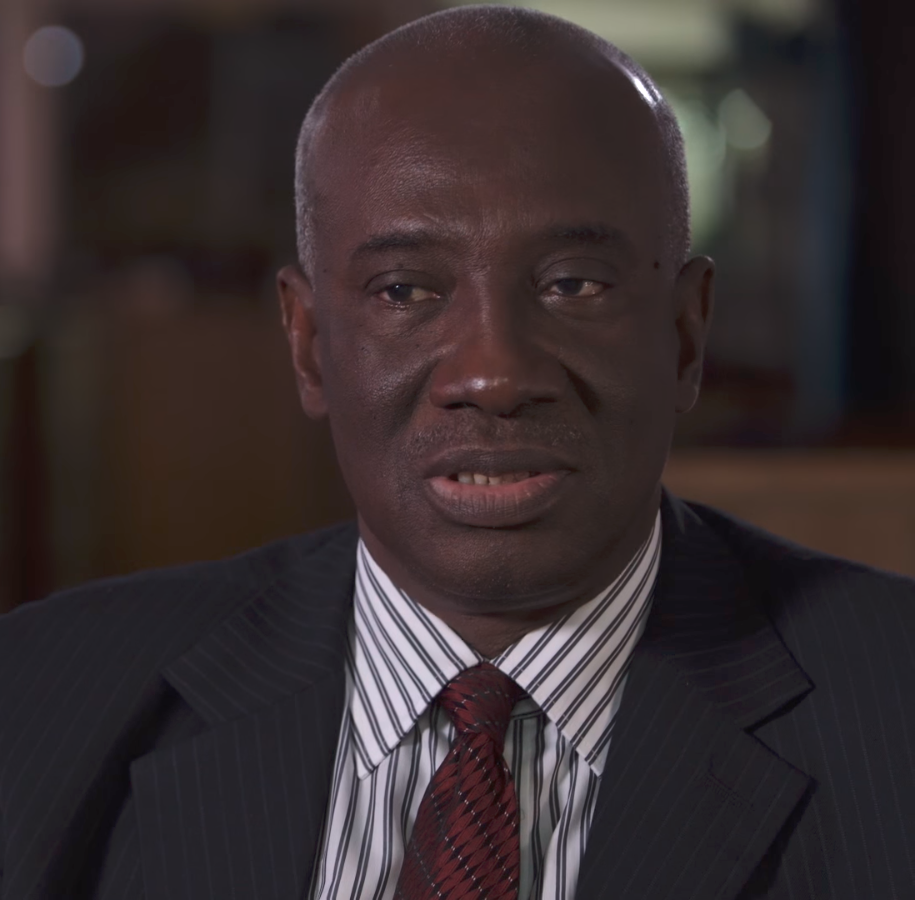
- Jallow in 2016

Chief Justice of the Gambia
- Incumbent
- Assumed office 15 February 2017
- President: Adama Barrow
- Preceded by: Emmanuel Fagbenle

Prosecutor of the International Residual Mechanism for Criminal Tribunals
- In office 1 March 2012 – 29 February 2016
- Preceded by: New position
- Succeeded by: Serge Brammertz

Prosecutor of the International Criminal Tribunal for Rwanda
- In office 15 September 2003 – 31 December 2016
- Preceded by: Carla Del Ponte
- Succeeded by: Position abolished

Justice of the Supreme Court of the Gambia
- In office December 1998 – July 2002
- President: Yahya Jammeh

Minister of Justice Attorney General of the Gambia
- In office July 1984 – July 1994
- President: Sir Dawda Jawara
- Preceded by: Fafa Edrissa M'Bai
- Succeeded by: Fafa Edrissa M'Bai

Solicitor General of the Gambia
- In office 1982–1984
- President: Sir Dawda Jawara
- Succeeded by: Raymond Sock

Personal details
- Born: 14 August 1951 (age 75) Bansang, British Gambia
- Citizenship: Gambian citizenship
- Education: University of Dar es Salaam; Nigerian Law School; University College London

Hassan Bubacar Jallow, (born 14 August 1951) is a Gambian judge who has served as Chief Justice of the Gambia since February 2017. He was the Prosecutor of the International Criminal Tribunal for Rwanda (ICTR) from 2003 to 2016, and the Prosecutor of the International Residual Mechanism for Criminal Tribunals (IRMCT) from 2012 to 2016, both at the rank of United Nations Under Secretary-General. He served as Minister of Justice and Attorney General from 1984 to 1994 under President Dawda Jawara.

== Early life and education ==
Jallow was born in Bansang, British Gambia on 14 August 1951. He was the son of Abubacar Jallow (d. 1997), an Imam and Islamic Scholar. He attended Saint Augustine's High School in Banjul from 1963 to 1969, and the Gambia High School from 1969 to 1971. He studied at the University of Dar es Salaam, Tanzania, in 1973 and graduated in 1976. He became a barrister-at-law in Nigeria in 1977 after studying for a year at the Nigerian Law School in Lagos. He acquired a master's degree in public international law from University College London in 1979.

== Early career ==
Jallow was called to the bar in the Gambia and Nigeria in 1977. He was enrolled as a barrister and solicitor of the supreme courts of the Gambia and Nigeria. Jallow worked as a state prosecutor at the Attorney General's Chambers in the Gambia from 1977 to 1982 and was principal state counsel for a period of time. He also served as acting Registrar General in charge of the registration of companies, patents, trademarks, and so on. At this time, he also worked as a legal expert for the Organisation of African Unity and was one of the expert drafters of the African Charter on Human and Peoples' Rights which was adopted in 1981.

Jallow was appointed Solicitor General in 1982, and as Attorney General and Minister of Justice in July 1984. He was removed from this role following Yahya Jammeh's coup d'état in July 1994. Between 1989 and 1994, he served as the chairman of Banjul-based African Centre for Democracy and Human Rights Studies (ACDHRS).

From December 1998 to July 2002, he served as a justice of the Supreme Court of the Gambia. He also carried out a judicial evaluation of the International Criminal Tribunal for Rwanda (ICTR) and the International Criminal Tribunal for the former Yugoslavia (ICTY). He worked for the Commonwealth of Nations as chair of their Governmental Working Group of Experts in Human Rights and as a Judge of the Commonwealth Arbitral Tribunal. In July 2002, he was suddenly removed from the Judiciary with no reason given but it was likely linked to an acclaimed but controversial Supreme Court ruling in the Ousman Sabally case.

== UN judge ==
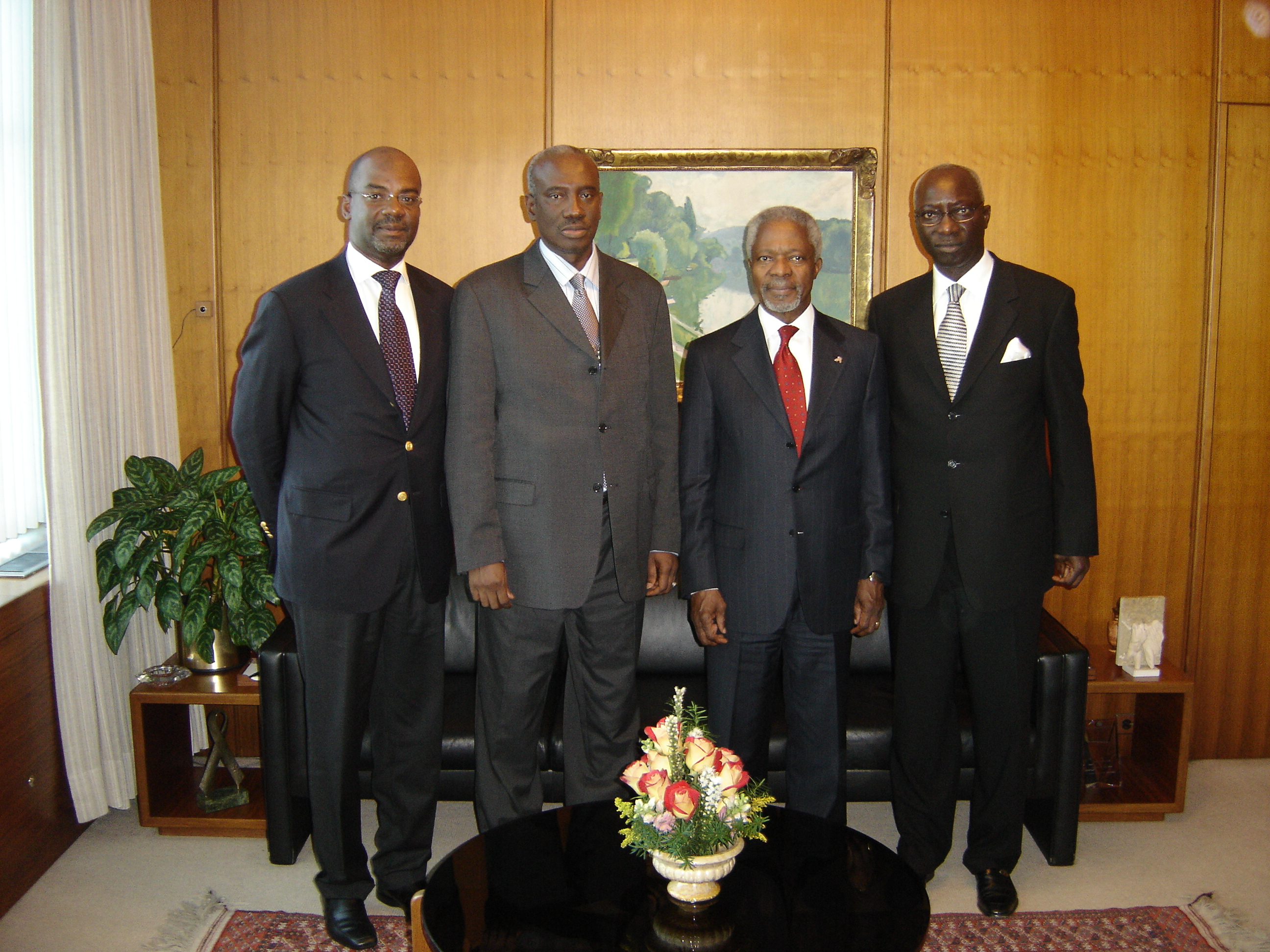
Jallow with Charles A. Adeogun-Phillips, Kofi Annan, and Adama Dieng in 2006.

In 2002, he was appointed by the Secretary General of the United Nations Kofi Annan as a Judge of the Appeals Chamber of the Special Court for Sierra Leone and served until 2003. In 2003, Kofi Annan nominated Jallow as United Nations Under-Secretary-General and Prosecutor of the International Criminal Tribunal for Rwanda (ICTR). He was confirmed in this role by the United Nations Security Council, succeeding Carla Del Ponte on 15 September 2003. Jallow became the first ICTR Prosecutor to not also be the Prosecutor of the International Criminal Tribunal for the former Yugoslavia. His mandate was renewed by the UN Security Council in 2007 and 2011.

On 1 March 2012, Jallow was also appointed United Nations Under-Secretary-General and Prosecutor of the International Residual Mechanism for Criminal Tribunals (IRMCT), to serve for a four-year term. He was a member of the Independent Review Panel on UN Response to Allegations of Sexual Abuse by Foreign Military Forces in the Central African Republic, alongside Marie Deschamps and Yasmin Sooka. Upon the conclusion of his term, he was praised by Secretary-General Ban Ki-moon as "instrumental to the successful fulfilment of the mandate of the [ICTR] and the efficient conduct of the work of the Office of the Prosecutor". In 2015, Charles Chernor Jalloh of Florida International University and Alhagi Marong of the United Nations International Criminal Tribunal for Rwanda praised Jallow's service in a research paper.

== As Chief Justice ==
On 15 February 2017, Jallow was sworn-in as the Chief Justice of the Gambia after his appointment by newly elected President of the Gambia, Adama Barrow. At the ceremony, he said "I have heard on a number of occasions the president reiterate his commitment for the judiciary and to its effectiveness. This declaration coming from the Office of the President to maintain the independence of the Judiciary is, indeed, very assuring and an excellent starting point for a new Chief Justice."

In 2020, Jallow was part of an independent probe (led by Mary Robinson) of a report that cleared Akinwumi Adesina, the president of the African Development Bank, of corruption charges.

== International Associations ==
He is a member of the Crimes Against Humanity Initiative Advisory Council, a project of the Whitney R. Harris World Law Institute at Washington University School of Law in St. Louis to establish the world's first treaty on the prevention and punishment of crimes against humanity.

== National Honour ==
He is a Commander of the Order of the Republic of The Gambia.
