= Ibrahim A. Omoson =

Ibrahim A. Omoson was the Chief Justice of Gambia from 1992 until 1995. He was succeeded by Omar H. Aghali in 1995.
