= Marie Saine-Firdaus =

Gambian lawyer and politician

Marie Saine Fridaus
- Born: 25 April 1973 (age 53)
- Citizenship: Gambia
- Education: Early education at St. Joseph's High school( 1992-1994) Bachelor of Law ( LLB) at the international Islamic university in Malaysia. Masters of law ( LLM ) in human rights and democratization in Africa from the university of Pretoria, South Africa. ( 2006)
- Occupations: Gambia lawyer and politician
- Organization: Member of the female lawyers association of the Gambia

Marie Saine-Firdaus (born 1973) is a Gambian lawyer and politician who served as the Attorney General and Secretary of State for Justice of the Gambia. She has held various legal positions within the Gambian government and has contributed to legal and human rights discourse in Africa.

== Early life and education ==
Born on 25 April 1973, Saine-Firdaus received her early education in Banjul, attending St. Joseph’s High School from 1987 to 1992 and later St. Augustine’s High School from 1992 to 1994. She then pursued higher education at the International Islamic University in Malaysia iwhere she obtained a Bachelor of Laws (LLB) in 2000. She later earned a Master of Laws (LLM) in Human Rights and Democratisation in Africa from the University of Pretoria, South Africa, in 2006.

== Legal career ==
After completing her legal education, Saine-Firdaus was admitted to the bar in Banjul in November 2000. She served as a state counsel November 2000 to 2003. She was promoted to Senior State Counsel in 2004 and served in that capacity until 2005, she was principal state counsel (2006 and served as acting deputy public prosecutor from January to May 2007. Following her tenure as acting deputy public prosecutor, she was appointed technical adviser to the office of the President.

== Attorney General and Secretary of State for Justice ==
Saine-Firdaus was appointed Secretary of State for Justice and Attorney General of the Gambia in September 2007. In October she headed a Gambian delegation sent to Taiwan. She was one of the recipients of the title Officer of the National Order of the Republic of The Gambia, conferred by Jammeh in May 2009. She was succeeded by Edward A. Gomez.

She later worked with the African Union as senior legal adviser responsible for human rights abuses.

== Economic crime charges ==
In December 2010, charges were filed at the Banjul Magistrates’ Court against former Attorney General and Minister of Justice Marie Saine-Firdaus and Edward Graham, then Managing Director of the Social Security and Housing Finance Corporation (SSHFC), over alleged economic crimes..

She is a member of the Female Lawyers Association of The Gambia.
