= Emmanuel Fagbenle =

Nigerian judge

Emmanuel Oluwasegun Fagbenle is a Nigerian judge who served as Yahya Jammeh's last chief justice of the Gambia from 2015 to 2017, until the 2016 presidential election.

== Early legal career ==
Fagbenle served as director of public prosecutions and a kudge of the Court of Appeal in the Gambia. He was appointed to the Court of Appeal in 2009. He also served as president of the Court of Appeal. Fagbenle was appointed as a justice of the Supreme Court of the Gambia, and served as its acting chief justice from 4 February 2014, when Mabel Agyeman was dismissed, to 6 March 2014, when Ali Nawaz Chowhan was appointed.

== As chief justice ==
Fagbenle was appointed chief justice on 13 May 2015, to replace Ali Nawaz Chowhan, a Pakistani justice.
