= Margaret Ramsay-Hale =

Jamaican lawyer and judge

Justice of the Grand Court of the Cayman Islands
- Incumbent
- Assumed office 13 January 2020

Chief Justice of the Turks and Caicos Islands
- In office 22 September 2014 – 10 January 2020
- Preceded by: Edwin Goldsbrough
- Succeeded by: Mabel Agyemang

Personal details
- Education: London School of Economics; University of the West Indies; Norman Manley Law School
- Occupation: Judge

Margaret Ramsay-Hale is a Jamaican lawyer and judge. She is currently serving as a justice of the Grand Court of the Cayman Islands, a position that she has held since 13 January 2020. Ramsay-Hale was previously the first female puisne judge and the first female chief justice of the Supreme Court of the Turks and Caicos Islands.

== Early life ==
Ramsay-Hale was born in Kingston, Jamaica. She is the daughter of Ian Ramsay, the first Jamaican lawyer to be appointed as a Queen's Counsel, and Rosa Ramsay. She moved to England to study for her A-Levels in 1977. She received a bachelors of science degree in economics from the London School of Economics in 1981. She began studying law at the University of the West Indies in September 1986 and attended the Norman Manley Law School. While she was studying at law school, Ramsay-Hale worked as a model, including in runway shows choreographed by Bert Rose.

She was called to the bar in October 1991 and began her career practicing privately in the chambers of Howard Hamilton QC. She is certified as a mediator. She was appointed as a crown council in the Office of the Director of Public Prosecutions in January 1994.

== Career ==
Ramsay-Hale was a family court judge in St James, Jamaica, and a magistrate in the parish's criminal courts. She moved to the Cayman Islands in September 1998, where she served as a magistrate in the Summary Court for ten years and as chief magistrate for three years. She was an acting judge for the Grand Court of the Cayman Islands in 2006 and was an appointed member of the Cayman Islands Panel of Acting Grand Court Judges in 2013.

She was appointed by Governor Ric Todd as a puisne judge for the Supreme Court of the Turks and Caicos Islands on 1 November 2011, becoming the first woman to be appointed to the Supreme Court. Ramsay-Hale was promoted to chief justice by Governor Peter Beckingham, following consultation by the Judicial Service Commission, on 19 June 2014. She was the first female chief justice of the Turks and Caicos Islands. She was sworn into this position on 22 September 2014. She served as the presiding judge for the civil and commercial divisions and worked in the criminal and matrimonial and family divisions. She was re-appointed for a further three-year term on 10 October 2017 by Governor John Freeman. She officially resigned the position on 10 January 2020.

Ramsay-Hale was appointed a judge of the Grand Court of the Cayman Islands by Governor Martyn Roper, which became effective on 13 January 2020.
