= Joseph Wiseham =

Chief Justice of the Gambia

Sir Joseph Wiseham (c.1907 – 1972) was the Chief Justice of the Gambia from 1957 to 1968. He was succeeded by Sir Phillip Bridges in 1968.

Wiseham died in Brighton, England in 1972 at the age of 65.
