= Raymond Sock =

Gambian judge and former politician

Justice of the Supreme Court of the Gambia
- Incumbent
- Assumed office 1 November 2017
- President: Adama Barrow
- In office 19 April 2012 – 25 June 2015
- President: Yahya Jammeh

Minister of Justice Attorney General of the Gambia
- In office March 2005 – 28 September 2005
- President: Yahya Jammeh
- Preceded by: Sheikh Tijan Hydara
- Succeeded by: Sheikh Tijan Hydara

Personal details
- Born: Raymond Claudius Sock; 5 June 1946 (age 80)
- Education: Lewis & Clark College; Pennsylvania State University; Inns of Court School of Law

Raymond Claudius Sock (born 5 June 1946) is a Gambian judge who currently serves as a Justice of the Supreme Court of the Gambia. He had previously served as a Justice from 2012 to 2015, when he was dismissed by President Yahya Jammeh.

== Early life and education ==
Sock received his primary and secondary education in The Gambia, completing his university education in the United States. He graduated with a bachelor's degree (cum laude) from Lewis & Clark College in Portland, Oregon, and a master's degree from Pennsylvania State University. He went on to train in law at the Inns of Court School of Law (now City, University of London) and Middle Temple, where he was called to the bar. He also completed a certificate in legislative drafting from the Australia Legislative Drafting Institute.

== Career ==
Sock joined the Attorney General's Chambers in 1980 as a state counsel. By 1989, he had become the Solicitor General and Legal Secretary, and was seconded to help establish the African Centre for Democracy and Human Rights Studies (ACDHRS), where he served as its first executive director, responsible for the creation of the centre's first programmes, in collaboration with organisations such as the International Commission of Jurists (ICJ). Between 1989 and 1995, Sock authored several articles on human rights in Africa and organised various meetings and workshops on the subject.

From 1995 to 2000, Sock worked in private legal practice as a senior partner, during which he handled both civil and criminal cases, including murder and treason. In 2000, he returned to the Ministry of Justice to take up his old job as Solicitor General. He was nominated by The Gambia as a judge of the International Criminal Court in 2002, though his nomination was not successful. For a brief period in 2005, he served as Minister of Justice and Attorney General. From 2005 to 2011, Sock worked as a consultant for the UNDP and ECOWAS, as well as the Gambian Ministry of Justice. He became the first Director-General of the Gambia Law School, which was established in October 2011.

In April 2012, Sock was sworn in as a Justice of the Supreme Court of the Gambia. He served as Acting Chief Justice from November 2012 to June 2013, being replaced by Justice Joseph Wowo. He was dismissed in June 2015 alongside Justice Gibou Janneh, a decision decried by Kairo News as "taking away the Gambian touch at the higher echelon in legal rulings." In October 2017, President Adama Barrow re-appointed Sock and Janneh to the Supreme Court.
