= Abubakar Datti Yahaya =

Nigerian judge (born 1952)

Abubakar Datti Yahaya (born 27 January 1952) is a Nigerian judge who is currently a Justice of the Supreme Court of the Gambia.

== Career ==
Yahaya was called to the bar in Nigeria on 2 July 1976. He served as a judge on the High Court of Kaduna State before becoming a justice of the Court of Appeal of Nigeria on 15 February 2008. His term is to end on 27 January 2022. He was a former Vice president of the Nigerian Red Cross Society, He was also a former President of the Court of appeal, The Gambia, 2000- 2003. A former member of the Common Wealth Magistrates and Judges Association (CMJA). Yahaya was sworn in on the Supreme Court of the Gambia on 30 December 2016, in order to hear President Yahya Jammeh's petition to overturn the 2016 presidential election result.
