= Muhammed Arif =

Pakistani judge

Ch. Muhammad Arif is a Pakistani judge who served as a served as Justice at the Supreme Court of Pakistan from 1998 to 2002. Within this period, he was Chief Justice of the Gambia from 2001 to 2003.

Justice (R) Ch. Muhammad Arif earned his L.L.B. from Punjab University in Lahore in 1958 and enrolled as a Pleader the same year. He subsequently registered as an advocate with the Lahore High Court in 1960. Mr. Arif earned his L.L.M. from University College London the same year he was called to the Bar in London's Lincoln's Inn.

He signed the Rolls of Senior Advocate for the Supreme Court in 1977 after enrolling as an advocate for the Pakistani Supreme Court in 1967. Mr. Arif also served as a member of the Punjab Bar Council and a member of the Punjab Bar Council Executive Committee. In 1978, he was elected President of the Lahore High Court Bar Association, a position he maintained for a year. After serving as the Bar Association's president, he was appointed to be the Punjab's Advocate General from 1979 to 1980. Moreover, he was also a part-time lecturer at University Law College from 1964 to 1987.

Having had a successful career as an advocate, he was elevated as a Judge for the Lahore High Court in 1987, he held this office for a decade, and within this period he also served as Federal Secretary Law, Justice, Human Rights & Parliamentary Affairs for the Govt. of Pakistan (1995–96). After serving as a judge in the LHC, he received an elevation to the Supreme Court, where he presided as a judge from 1997 to 2002, after which he was appointed as the Chief Justice of The Republic of The Gambia from 2002 to 2004. From 2005 to 2007, he served as the Chairman of the Federal Services Tribunal.

He was also the founding partner of Arif n Arif, a law firm situated in Lahore. His office is now headed by his son Muhammad Usman Arif, who has served as Deputy Attorney General for Pakistan from 2018 to 2022
