= Akomaye Agim =

Nigerian judge

Emmanuel Akomaye Agim
- Born: Obudu, Cross River State, Nigeria
- Occupations: Judge, Chief Justice of Gambia
- Awards: Patron of the Nigerian Community of The Gambia - conferred by the Nigerian community occasion of the 2007 Nigerian Independence Day in The Gambia.

Emmanuel Akomaye Agim is a Nigerian judge who was chief justice of Gambia from 2009 to 2013 former chief justice of Swaziland. former justice at the Nigerian Courts of Appeal. and currently a Justice of the Supreme Court of Nigeria.

== Early life and education ==
Agim was born on 26 April 1960, in Obudu, Cross River State, Nigeria. He obtained his first degree at University of Calabar LLB(Hons), then BL from Nigerian Law School Lagos and subsequently LLM from the University of Wolverhampton, United Kingdom.

== Career ==
Agim was enrolled as a legal practitioner on 15 October 1986.

=== Professional experience ===
Agim is a jurist, public prosecutor, private legal practitioner, legal writer, judicial trainer and administrator, Justice Ministry Administrator/Trainer of State Counsel, Commonwealth Crimes Victim Expert, Law office Manager, Adjunct Professor, Adviser/Resource Person on Environmental Laws.

=== Offices held ===
Agim was the:

- Chief Judge, Republic of the Gambia
- Judge of the Supreme Court of the Gambia
- Chairman, General Legal Council
- Member, ECOWAS Council of Chief of Justices
- Chairman, Legal Capacity Building Programme Board, The Gambia
- Chairman, Judicial Service Commission of The Gambia
- Acting Justice of the Supreme Court, The Gambia
- President, Court of Appeal of the Republic of the Gambia
- Acting Chief Justice, Republic of the Gambia during a brief absence of the then chief justice
- Chairman, National Council for Law Reporting of The Gambia
- Member - Chancery of the Republic of Gambia
- Judge Advocate, General Court Martial of The Gambia
- Director of Public Prosecutions, Ministry of Justice, Republic of The Gambia
- Managing Solicitor/Advocate, Veritas Chambers, No. 1A Agoja Road, Obudu, Cross River, Nigeria
- Chairman, Nigerian Bar Association, Ogoja Branch, Cross River State, Nigeria
- Secretary, Nigerian Bar Association, Ogoja Branch, Cross River State, Nigeria
- Member, Board of Directors, Cross River State Government owned Estates Limited

=== Writings/Publications ===
- Co-author of the Commonwealth Guidelines For the Treatment of Victims
- Crime (2003, ISBN 0-85092-725-0 /978-0-85092-725-2)
- Co-author of Pre-Trial Criminal Processes in the Commonwealth States - The Gambia Experience (2005, Banjul, LCCN 2007-327724)
- United Nation Convention on International State of Goods Contracts (CISG) 1980 and the Gambia - The need for its adoption in The Gambia (unpublished work) LLM Desertation
- The Law of Sedition in Nigeria (Unpublished)
- Statements of Supreme Court in Nigeria (Unpublished)
- Gambian Criminal Appeals Cases Digest; Vol. 1&2 (Unpublished)
- Gambia Legal System, Critical Perspectives and Alternative Realities

=== Memberships ===
- Member - International Bar Association
- Member - International Panel Association
- Member - Association of Lawyers for the Defence of the Unborn
- Member - Nigerian Bar Association
- Member - Commonwealth Magistrates & Judges Association
- Member - World Jurist Association

=== Awards and honors ===
- Order of the Republic of The Gambia (ORG) - one of the highest national honors of the Republic of The Gambia - conferred by the President of The Gambia
- Patron of the Nigerian Community of The Gambia - conferred by the Nigerian community occasion of the 2007 Nigerian Independence Day in The Gambia
- Special Recognition for distinguished academic work in law by the African Insurance Institute, The Gambia, during the 2008 convocation and 25 years anniversary ceremony.
