= Joseph Wowo =

Nigerian barrister

Joseph Wowo is a Nigerian barrister who joined the Gambian judiciary in 2000 and became the chief justice of Gambia from 20 June 2013 until 19 July 2013.

== Removal from office ==
He was removed from the office by then President Yahaya Jammeh and convicted after being allegedly caught on tape soliciting a bribe of 500,000 Dalasi from a Dutch businessman in order to alter the course of justice in a land dispute matter. He was convicted and sentenced to two years in prison in January 2014 by the Special Criminal Court in Banjul. He however sued the Gambian government to the ECOWAS court which ruled The Gambia to pay $200,000 to him for unlawful removal from office and incarceration in 2019.
