= John Iles Mantell =

British judge

Sir John Iles Mantell (1 December 1813 – 12 July 1893) was a British judge who served in both the Gambia and in Lancashire.

== Early life and education ==
Mantell was the eldest son of George Mantell of Faringdon, Berkshire, a medical doctor. Born on 1 December 1813, Mantell was educated at Radley College and was a student at Middle Temple from 1 November 1841.

== Judicial career ==
Mantell was a Queen's Advocate in the Gambia from 1841 to 1847, before being called to the bar on 18 June 1847. He then became chief justice and judge of the Vice-Admiralty Court of the Gambia, serving from 1847 to 1866. He was knighted on 9 August 1867, and became a stipendiary magistrate for Manchester in 1869. He served until 1885. He also served as a Justice of the Peace for Lancashire.

== Personal life ==
Mantell married Susan Finch in 1838 at St Martins in the Fields, and they had one daughter in 1850, Laura. It has been suggested that Susan died in The Gambia. Mantell re-married to Elinor Knight in January 1867, the daughter of Charles Hitchcock, a medical doctor from Devizes, Wiltshire.
