= Stephen Alan Brobbey =

Ghanaian jurist

Justice Stephen Alan Brobbey

Supreme Court Judge
- In office 2002–2012
- Appointed by: John Kufuor

Chief Justice of the Gambia
- In office 2004–2006
- Appointed by: Yahya Jammeh
- Preceded by: Muhammed Arif
- Succeeded by: Abdou Kareem Savage

Personal details
- Born: Stephen Alan Brobbey
- Education: University of Ghana
- Occupation: Judge

Stephen Alan Brobbey is a retired jurist. He was a justice of the Supreme Court of Ghana and once served as Chief Justice of the Gambia.

== Education ==
Brobbey had his secondary school education at Opoku Ware School and continued at the University of Ghana where he obtained his bachelor of laws degree (LLB) in 1966.

== Career ==
Brobbey was called to the bar in 1967 and begun private legal practice for some time before joining the Council for Law Reporting. He left Ghana for the United Kingdom for his post graduate studies and returned to Ghana in 1972. That same year, he was appointed a grade one district magistrate by the then Government of Ghana. He served as a magistrate until 1979 when he was appointed a circuit court judge. In 1981 he joined the Zimbabwean Judiciary as a legal consultant under the auspices of the Commonwealth Trust Fund Technical Co-operation. Upon his return to Ghana from his stint in Zimbabwe in 1986, he was appointed a high court judge. He was appointed appeal court judge in 1991 and in 2002 he was appointed justice of the Supreme Court of Ghana. From 2004 to 2006 he served as Chief Justice of the Gambia. He resumed his post as a justice of the supreme court of Ghana from 2006 until his retirement on 23 May 2012. Prior to his retirement he served as the chairman of the Automation Committee of the Ghana Judicial Service, a committee whose core mandate is to mechanize courts throughout the country. In 2018 he was made chairman of the board of governors of the Economic and Organised Crime Office (EOCO), that same year he was appointed by the government of Ghana to chair the Commission of Inquiry into the creation of new regions.

== See also ==
- List of judges of the Supreme Court of Ghana
- Supreme Court of Ghana
- Chief Justice of the Gambia
