= Jizzle (artist) =

Gambian musical artist (born 1994)

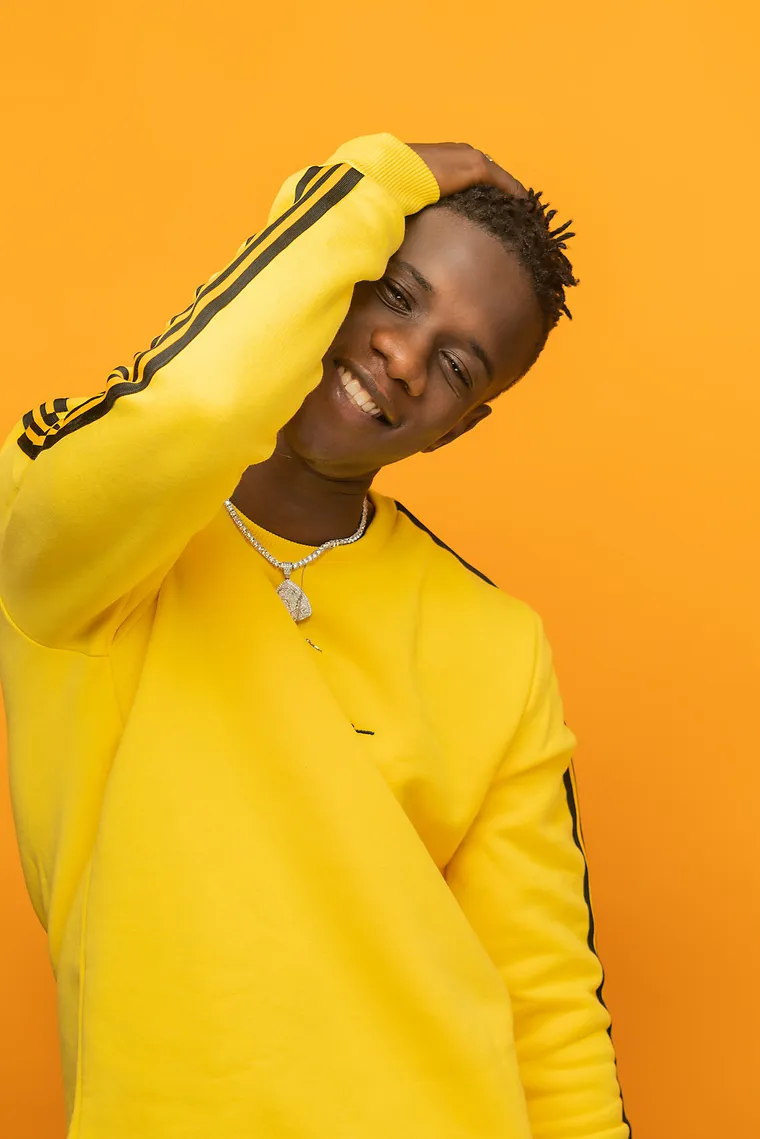
- Jerreh Jallow - Jizzle
- Born: August 14, 1994 (age 31); The Gambia
- Occupation: Musician

Jerreh Jallow (born 14 August 1994), professionally known as Jizzle, is a Gambian Afro-pop artist. He won the artist of the year award at the Whasahalat Music Awards in 2018. He was also nominated for the All Africa Music Awards Best artist in 2016. In 2014, he won the Best Upcoming Artist of the Year 2014 category at the Gambian Entertainment Awards. He is very popular in the country, and is known for blending locally used languages.

Originally aspiring to compete in soccer, Jizzle started in music in 2009 after watching his brother Essa, known as "Breaker," performing music.

He describes being influenced by Lil Wayne, Drake, Wizkid, Mr. Eazi, Davido, T-Smalls and Mighty Joe. He is brand ambassador for 1xbet.

== Discography ==
=== Albums ===
- Me Vs Me (2023)
- The Next Big Thing (2018)
- Finally (2019) (featuring Dip Doundou Guiss, Shaydee, Samba, Peuzzi, Bm Jaay, and Hakill)
- Scorpi (2020)
- "Scorpi Vol. 2" (2021) https://audiomack.com/iamjizzle_/album/scorpion-ep-vol2
