= Attorney General of the Gambia =

Cabinet-level position in the Gambia

- Coat of arms of the Gambia
- Incumbent; Dawda A. Jallow since 30 June 2020
- Style: The Honourable
- Member of: Gambian Cabinet
- Residence: Attorney General's Chambers; Marina Parade; Banjul
- Appointer: President of the Gambia
- Inaugural holder: William Richard Townsend
- Formation: 1902
- Deputy: Solicitor General
- Website: www.moj.gov.gm

The Attorney General of the Gambia is a cabinet-level position in the Gambia responsible for providing legal advice to the Gambian government and appearing on its behalf in the courts of the land. In recent years, the post has been held in conjunction with that of Minister of Justice, who is the head of the Ministry of Justice and responsible for legal affairs. The current Attorney General is Dawda A. Jallow.

== History ==
The office of Attorney General has been described by Hassan Bubacar Jallow as having "great antiquity" in the Gambia. Its origins can be traced back to the creation of the office of King's Advocate in 1831, formed to head the Legal Adviser's Office. From 1831 to 1837, Andrew Hunter, the Colonial Secretary, performed the office as part of his duties. After his death from yellow fever in April 1837, Thomas Lewis Ingram became the acting King's Advocate. In 1839, following the accession of Queen Victoria, Richard Pine was appointed the Queen's Advocate. In 1841, John Iles Mantell was appointed the Queen's Advocate, serving until 1847, when he became Chief Justice. In the early 1860s, Alexander Ingram was the Queen's Advocate. From 1861 to 1866, Thomas Brown served as Queen's Advocate.

The first Attorney General of the Gambia, William Richard Townsend, was appointed in 1902. The Legal Adviser's Office was staffed with Legal Assistants, who assisted the Attorney General in his work. The first of these was Donald Kingdon, who went on to become Chief Justice of Nigeria in 1929. From 1913 to 1945, these Legal Assistants were known as Legal Advisers to the Crown. In 1945, the Legal Adviser's Office was re-designated as the Crown Law Office, with the Attorney General remaining as its head.

The office underwent a period of growth. In 1953, only the Attorney General and a single Legal Adviser were listed as law officers in the Gambia, but by 1966, an Attorney General, Solicitor General, Registrar General and Crown Counsel were all recorded. 1966 was also the first time a Solicitor General was provided for the Gambia. The 1965 constitution, upon independence, provided for the Attorney General to be the principal legal adviser to the Gambian government and also stated that it should be a full government minister. The constitution also created the independent office of Director of Public Prosecutions to oversee criminal prosecutions.

In 1968, a Ministry of Justice was created, with the new title of the department becoming the Attorney General's Chambers and Ministry of Justice. The 1970 republican constitution made the Attorney General a voting member of the House of Representatives.

== Eligibility and functions ==
=== Eligibility ===
According to Section 71 (2) of the Constitution of the Gambia, the Attorney General must be a "legal practitioner of at least five years standing" at the Gambian bar.

=== Functions ===
The role of Attorney General is a civil service role and an ex officio member of the cabinet. However, when the portfolio of Minister of Justice came into being in 1968, it was seen as prudent to combine the two roles.

Section 72 (2) of the Constitution states that the Attorney General "shall be the principal legal adviser to the Government and shall have the right of audience in all courts in the Gambia." Section 84 (1) states that the Director of Public Prosecutions (DPP) must seek approval from the Attorney General before initiating proceedings, and Section 85 (4) states that the DPP is subject "to the direction or control" of the Attorney General.

Section 82 (2) says that the Attorney General shall automatically be granted a position on any committee on the exercise of the prerogative of mercy. Section 137 A (4) grants the Attorney General a position on the Cadi Appeals Selection Committee.

=== Assistants ===
The principal assistant to the Attorney General is the Solicitor General, who is authorised to deputise for the Attorney General when required. Also, the Director of Public Prosecutions can exercise some of the Attorney General's powers, most notably discontinuing court cases (nolle prosequi). There are six directorates in the Ministry of Justice that the Attorney General, as Minister of Justice, also has control over.

== List of attorneys general (1965–present) ==
Name (Birth–Death)	Term of office		Political party	President
Sir Phillip Bridges (1922–2007)	1965	1968	None	Sir Dawda Jawara
M. L. Saho (1932–1993)	1968	11 May 1982	People's Progressive Party	Sir Dawda Jawara
Edrissa Fafa M'Bai (1942–2025)	11 May 1982	June 1984	People's Progressive Party	Sir Dawda Jawara
Hassan Bubacar Jallow (1951–)	July 1984	July 1994	People's Progressive Party	Sir Dawda Jawara
Edrissa Fafa M'Bai (1942–2025)	August 1994	March 1995	None	Armed Forces Provisional Ruling Council
Hawa Sisay-Sabally (–) [1st female]	April 1996	31 July 1998	APRC	Yahya Jammeh
Fatou Bensouda (1961–)	31 July 1998	March 2000	APRC	Yahya Jammeh
Pap Cheyassin Secka (1942–2012)	March 2000	January 2001	APRC	Yahya Jammeh
Joseph Henry Joof (1960–)	January 2001	17 November 2003	APRC	Yahya Jammeh
Sheikh Tijan Hydara (–)	17 November 2003	March 2005	APRC	Yahya Jammeh
Raymond Sock (–)	March 2005	28 September 2005	APRC	Yahya Jammeh
Sheikh Tijan Hydara (–)	28 September 2005	13 November 2006	APRC	Yahya Jammeh
Kebba Sanyang (–)	13 November 2006	14 September 2007	APRC	Yahya Jammeh
Marie Saine-Firdaus (–)	14 September 2007	19 March 2010	APRC	Yahya Jammeh
Edward Gomez (–)	19 March 2010	13 February 2012	APRC	Yahya Jammeh
Lamin Jobarteh (–)	13 February 2012	25 May 2013	APRC	Yahya Jammeh
Amie Joof (–)	25 May 2013	27 August 2013	APRC	Yahya Jammeh
Mama Fatima Singhateh (–)	27 August 2013	27 August 2014	APRC	Yahya Jammeh
Basiru Mahoney (–)	27 August 2014	9 January 2015	APRC	Yahya Jammeh
Mama Fatima Singhateh (–)	12 January 2015	17 January 2017	APRC	Yahya Jammeh
Ba Tambadou (1972–)	7 February 2017	30 June 2020	Independent	Adama Barrow
Dawda A. Jallow (1972–)	30 June 2020	Incumbent	Independent	Adama Barrow

== See also ==
- Justice ministry
- Politics of the Gambia
