= Cabinet of the Gambia =

The Cabinet of The Gambia is responsible for advising the President of the Gambia and for carrying out other functions as prescribed by law. It is composed of the President, the Vice-President, and the cabinet ministers. It is responsible for regulating the procedure of its own meetings and is held accountable for its actions by the National Assembly of the Gambia, according to Sections 74 and 75 of the Constitution of the Gambia.

The current cabinet of the Gambia is led by president Adama Barrow.

== Cabinet ministers ==
According to Section 71 (2) of the Constitution of the Gambia, a person cannot serve as a Minister in the Cabinet of the Gambia if they are a member of the National Assembly or hold citizenship in any other country. In addition, the Attorney General must have been a member of the Gambian bar for at least five years prior to their appointment.

Cabinet ministers are appointed directly by the President of the Gambia and must swear an oath before assuming the functions of their office. The office of a cabinet minister becomes vacant following the assumption of office by a new President, by the revoking of their appointment by the sitting President, by their resignation or by their death. Section 71 (5) also states that if there is a vote of censure against a cabinet minister by the National Assembly, the President will also revoke their appointment.

== Roles ==
- President
- Vice-President
- Minister of Women's Affairs
- Minister of Defence
- Minister of Foreign Affairs
- Minister of Finance and Economic Affairs
- Minister of Tourism and Culture
- Minister of Higher Education, Research, Science and Technology
- Minister of Basic and Secondary Education
- Minister of Health and Social Welfare
- Minister of Agriculture
- Minister of Trade, Industry, Regional Integration and Employment
- Minister of Forestry, Environment, Climate Change and Natural Resources
- Minister of Fisheries, Water Resources and National Assembly Matters
- Minister of Energy and Petroleum
- Minister of Lands and Regional Government
- Minister of Justice/Attorney General
- Minister of Information and Communication Infrastructure
- Minister of the Interior
- Minister of Youth and Sports
- Minister of Transport, Works and Infrastructure
