= Ali Nawaz Chowhan =

Pakistani judge (died 2023)

- Died: 3 September 2023
- Occupation: Pakistani judge

Justice Ali Nawaz Chowhan (died 3 September 2023) was a Pakistani judge. He started as a district judge in 1977 and was judge of the Lahore High Court from 1999 to 2005. From 2006, he was a judge for the Yugoslavia tribunal for three years. He was a judge for UNESCO in 2010. He was the Chief Justice of Gambia from 6 March 2014 until 12 May 2015. He was appointed as first chairman of Pakistan's National Commission on Human Rights (NCHR) in 2015.

== Education ==
Chowhan studied at the University of Punjab and obtained both a Bachelor of Arts and a Bachelor of Laws there. He also obtained degrees in sharia law and law at three different universities: in Pakistan the International Islamic University in Islamabad and in Saudi Arabia the International Islamic University in Medina and the Umm al-Qura University in Mecca. He also followed several other in-depth studies in Pakistan and the United States, such as in the field of civil service law and the fight against drugs.

== Death ==
Chowhan died from a cardiac arrest at Shifa International Hospital in Islamabad, on 3 September 2023. He was laid to rest in Rawalpindi on 4 September.
