= Constitution of the Gambia =

Supreme law of The Gambia

The Constitution of the Gambia is the supreme law of the Republic of the Gambia.

== History ==
The Gambia became a nation independent from the colonial rule of the British Empire in 1965 and adopted a constitution. The constitution was suspended by a military coup d'état in 1994. A revised constitution that came into effect in January 1997 then marked an official return to civilian control of the government, although the leader of the coup, Yahya Jammeh, remained in power as President for another 20 years and exercised strong de facto personal control over the country.

Following the 2016 presidential election, there was a constitutional crisis after Jammeh rejected the official results of the election and refused to step down. He was then ejected from power by a military intervention by nations of the ECOWAS regional alliance, allowing the new president, Adama Barrow, to enter the office in January 2017.
