= Minister of Justice (The Gambia) =

Head of gambia attorney

Minister of Justice of the Gambia
- Coat of arms of the Gambia
- Incumbent; Dawda A. Jallow since 30 June 2020
- Style: The Honourable
- Member of: Gambian Cabinet
- Residence: Ministry of Justice; Marina Parade; Banjul
- Appointer: President of the Gambia
- Inaugural holder: M. L. Saho
- Formation: 1968
- Website: www.moj.gov.gm

The Minister of Justice in the Gambia is the cabinet member who heads the Ministry of Justice. All Ministers of Justice concurrently serve as Attorney General.

== Role ==
The role of a Minister of Justice was created in 1968 to have administrative responsibility for the judicial system and take on some responsibility from the Prime Minister (later President)'s Office, such as that of the Registrar General. The Ministry currently has five departments, Civil Litigation, Curator of Interstate Estate, Legislative Drafting, Criminal Division, and the Registrar General's Office. The Ministry is also responsible for the registration and conduct of civil marriages. The line agencies for the Ministry are the Gambia Law Reform Commission, the National Council for Law Reporting, the Alternative Disputes Resolution Secretariat and the Legal Aid Secretariat.
