= 2026 in the Gambia =

- Decades: 2000s; 2010s; 2020s
- See also: Other events of 2026; Timeline of Gambian history

Events in the year 2026 in the Gambia.

== Incumbents ==
- President: Adama Barrow
- Vice-President of the Gambia: Muhammad B.S. Jallow
- Chief Justice: Hassan Bubacar Jallow

== Events ==
=== January ===
- 1 January – At least seven people die and 96 are rescued after a migrant boat carrying over 200 people capsizes overnight off the coast of the North Bank Division.

=== March ===
- 30 March – Former interior minister Ousman Sonko appears before the Federal Criminal Court of Switzerland’s appeals chamber in Bellinzona to challenge his 2024 conviction for crimes against humanity committed during the rule of Yahya Jammeh.

=== September ===
- 7 September – Protests break out in Banjul against prolonged power outages that began in June. Three days later, the Inspector General of Police announces that all protests and public gatherings will require an approved permit.

=== November ===
- 19 November – The International Court of Justice rules in favour of the Gambia in The Gambia v. Myanmar, finding that Myanmar committed genocide against its Rohingya minority during its 2016–2017 military operations.

=== Upcoming ===
- 5 December – 2026 Gambian presidential election

== Holidays ==
- 1 January – New Year's Day
- 18 February – Independence Day
- 20 March – Koriteh
- 3 April – Good Friday
- 6 April – Easter Monday
- 1 May – Labour Day
- 9 May – Ascension Day
- 25 May – Africa Day
- 26 May – Tabaski
- 26 June – Ashura
- 22 July – Revolution Day
- 15 August – Assumption Day
- 25 August – The Prophet's Birthday
- 1 November – All Saints' Day
- 25 December – Christmas Day

== Deaths ==
- 8 January – Musa Gibril Bala Gaye, 79, minister of finance (2003–2009) and foreign affairs (2005)
- 2 May – Yaya Ceesay, 88–89, MP (1960–1994)
