= 2027 in the Gambia =

- Decades: 2000s; 2010s; 2020s
- See also: Other events of 2027; Timeline of Gambian history

Events in the year 2027 in the Gambia.

== Incumbents ==
- President: Adama Barrow
- Vice-President of the Gambia: Muhammad B.S. Jallow
- Chief Justice: Hassan Bubacar Jallow

== Events ==
=== Scheduled ===
- 10 April – 2027 Gambian parliamentary election.

== Holidays ==
- 1 January – New Year's Day
- 18 February – Independence Day
- 10 March – Koriteh
- 26 March – Good Friday
- 29 May – Easter Monday
- 1 May – Labour Day
- 6 May – Ascension Day
- 17 May – Tabaski
- 25 May – Africa Day
- 15 June – Ashura
- 22 July – Revolution Day
- 15 August – Assumption Day
- 25 August – The Prophet's Birthday
- 1 November – All Saints' Day
- 25 December – Christmas Day
