= 2022 in the Gambia =

- Decades: 2000s; 2010s; 2020s
- See also: Other events of 2022; Timeline of Gambian history

Events in the year 2022 in the Gambia.

== Incumbents ==
- President: Adama Barrow
- Vice-President of the Gambia: Isatou Touray (until 4 May, 2022); Badara Joof onwards
- Chief Justice: Hassan Bubacar Jallow

== Events ==
Ongoing — COVID-19 pandemic in the Gambia

- 3 August – Two people are killed after heavy flooding in The Gambia.
- 9 October – An investigation is launched in the Gambia into the deaths of 66 children during the past three months, which have been linked to four brands of imported cough syrup.
- 21 December - Four soldiers are arrested after an alleged coup attempt the previous day.

== Deaths ==
- 20 February – Dawda Fadera, diplomat, ambassador to the United States.
