= Public holidays in the Gambia =

This is a list of public holidays in The Gambia.

== Public holidays ==
Date	English name	Description
January 1	New Year's Day	
February 18	Independence Day	From the United Kingdom, 1965
March or April	Good Friday	Crucifixion of Jesus
March or April	Easter Monday	Day after Easter
May 1	Labour Day	Also International Workers' Day
May 25	Africa Day	Celebrates African diversity and freedom across the continent.
August 15	Assumption Day	
December 25	Christmas Day	
December 26	Boxing Day	
Muharram 10	Yawmul Ashura	Commemorates the victory of the Prophet Moses over the pharaohs.
Rabi' al-awwal 12	Mawlid Nabi	Birthday of Muhammad (c. 570 CE).
Ramadan 27	Lialat-Ul-Qadr	Revelation of the Quran
Shawwal 1	Koriteh	Breaking of the Ramadan fast
Dhu al-Hijjah 10	Tobaski	Feast of the Sacrifice of the Prophet Abraham

== Variable dates ==
- 2020
  - Good Friday – April 10
  - Easter Monday – April 13
  - Qadr Night (Revelation of the Quran) – May 20
  - Korité (Breaking of the Ramadan fast) – May 24
  - Tabaski (Feast of the Sacrifice) – starts July 31
  - Ashura – starts sundown, August 28
  - Mawlid – starts at sundown, October 28
- 2021
  - Good Friday – April 2
  - Easter Monday – April 5
  - Qadr Night (Revelation of the Quran) – May 9
  - Korité (Breaking of the Ramadan fast) – May 13
  - Tabaski (Feast of the Sacrifice) – starts July 20
- 2022
  - Good Friday – April 15
  - Easter Monday – April 18
  - Qadr Night (Revelation of the Quran) – April 29
  - Korité (Breaking of the Ramadan fast) – May 2
  - Tabaski (Feast of the Sacrifice) – starts July 9
- 2023
  - Good Friday – April 7
  - Easter Monday – April 10
  - Qadr Night (Revelation of the Quran) – April 17
  - Korité (Breaking of the Ramadan fast)– April 21
  - Tabaski – starts June 28
- 2024
  - Good Friday – March 29
  - Easter Monday – April 1
  - Qadr Night (Revelation of the Quran) – April 6
  - Korité (Breaking of the Ramadan fast)– April 10
  - Tabaski (Feast of the Sacrifice) – starts June 16
- 2025
  - Good Friday – April 18
  - Easter Monday – April 21
- 2026
  - Good Friday – April 3
  - Easter Monday – April 6
