= 1996 Gambian constitutional referendum =

8 August 1996

Results
Choice	Votes	%
Yes	270,093	70.37%
No	113,744	29.63%
Valid votes	383,837	99.99%
Invalid or blank votes	38	0.01%
Total votes	383,875	100.00%
Registered voters/turnout	441,732	86.9%

A constitutional referendum was held in the Gambia on 8 August 1996. The new constitution was approved by 70% of voters, with a voter turnout of 87%.

== Background ==
Elected president Dawda Jawara was overthrown in a military coup led by Yahya Jammeh on 22 July 1994. Following the coup, Jammeh ruled Gambia by decree as head of the Armed Forces Provisional Ruling Council, with all political activity banned. He promised a return to civilian rule within four years, and a constitution was drawn up following a controversial consultation process.

The new constitution allowed for multiparty elections, an unlimited number of five year presidential terms and lowered the voting age from 21 to 18.

== Results ==
Choice	Votes	%
For	270,093	70.36
Against	113,744	29.64
Invalid/blank votes	38	–
Total	383,875	100
Registered voters/turnout	441,732	86.90
Source: Direct Democracy

== Aftermath ==
Presidential elections were held in August 1996, which were won by Jammeh (despite him denying that he would stand until shortly before the election). In January 1997, parliamentary elections were held and won by Jammeh's Alliance for Patriotic Reorientation and Construction.
