= 2002 Gambian parliamentary election =

- 17 January 2002
- All 53 seats in the National Assembly; 27 seats needed for a majority
- Turnout: 56.38% (▼16.83pp)
Party	Leader	Seats	+/–
APRC	Yahya Jammeh	45	+12
PDOIS	Sidia Jatta	2	+1
NRP	Hamat Bah	1	−1
This lists parties that won seats. See the complete results below.
Speaker of the National Assembly before	Speaker of the National Assembly after
Mustapha B. Wadda; APRC	Sheriff Mustapha Dibba; APRC

Parliamentary elections were held in the Gambia on 17 January 2002. They were boycotted by several opposition parties, including the United Democratic Party. As a result, the ruling Alliance for Patriotic Reorientation and Construction of President Yahya Jammeh ran unopposed in 33 of the 48 elected seats, and won 12 of the 15 seats in which they had opposition.

In seats where there was a vote, turnout was 56.4%.

== Results ==
Party	Votes	%	Seats	+/–
Alliance for Patriotic Reorientation and Construction			45	+12
National Reconciliation Party			1	–1
People's Democratic Organisation for Independence and Socialism			2	+1
Independents			0	–2
Presidential appointees			5	+1
Total			53	+4
Valid votes	94,586	99.96		
Invalid/blank votes	35	0.04		
Total votes	94,621	100.00		
Registered voters/turnout	167,817	56.38		
Source: African Elections Database
