= 2023 in the Gambia =

- Decades: 2000s; 2010s; 2020s
- See also: Other events of 2023; Timeline of Gambian history

Events in the year 2023 in the Gambia.

== Incumbents ==
- President: Adama Barrow
- Vice-President of the Gambia: Badara Joof (until 17 January); Muhammad B.S. Jallow onwards
- Chief Justice: Hassan Bubacar Jallow

== Events ==
Ongoing — COVID-19 pandemic in the Gambia

- 13 May – 2023 Gambian local elections
- 24 February – Gambian president Adama Barrow appoints Muhammad B.S. Jallow as the country's new vice-president after the previous one, Badara Joof, died last month in India.
- 6 April – The Gambia confirms a case of bird flu.

== Deaths ==
- 17 January — Badara Joof, 65, politician, vice-president (since 2022).
- 25 January — Edrissa Marong, 27, long-distance runner.
