= Bakary Bunja Darbo =

Gambian politician (born 1946)

5th Vice President of the Gambia
- Tenure: 1982–1992
- President: Dawda Jawara
- Predecessor: Assan Musa Camara
- Successor: Saihou Sabally
- Born: 1946 (age 79–80)

Bakary Bunja Darbo (born 1946) is a Gambian politician, economist and lawyer who was vice president of the Gambia from 1982 to 1992. Born in Dumbutto village, Western Kiang, The Gambia, he has held various roles in The Gambia's political and administrative landscape. A member of the Mandinka ethnic group, Dabo’s career spans public administration, diplomacy, banking, and opposition politics.

Darboe is veteran Gambian politician, who has had a career spanning several decades, beginning in the 1980s. Darboe first entered the political arena as a member of the People's Progressive Party (PPP), where he held key positions and contributed to the governance and development of the country during the first republic under Sir Dawda Kairaba Jawara.

During the 1994 coup in The Gambia, Dabo a finance minister at the time fled to Dakar, Senegal with former president Jawara. But he later returned to serve as minister of finance under the Armed Forces Provisional Ruling Council (AFPRC). However, he resigned on October 10, 1994. He was accused by the junta of being part of the November 11 foiled coup. Following these events, Dabo fled again, first to Senegal and later to the United Kingdom, where he continued to actively oppose the government of Yahya Jammeh. In the post-Yaya Jammeh era, he continued to engage actively in the political process of the Gambia despite his age.

== Early life and education ==
Dabo was born in 1946 in Dumbutto village in Kiang district, The Gambia. He received his primary education locally before attending the Methodist Boys’ School and The Gambia High School in Bathurst (now Banjul) between 1957 and 1964. Dabo pursued higher education at the University of Ibadan in Nigeria, graduating in 1967 with a degree in modern languages. He continued his studies at the University of Abidjan in Ivory Coast, focusing on economic training and specialising in tourism

== Early career ==
Dabo began his career in public administration, serving as an assistant divisional commissioner in Basse and later as divisional commissioner in Kerewan from 1967 to 1971.His first role (1967–1968) was as an assistant divisional commissioner, followed by a second stint (1970–1971) as divisional commissioner.Between these postings, he worked as an assistant secretary in the Ministry of External Affairs. In July 1971, he was appointed director of economic and technical affairs and, in June 1974, became the manager of commercial operations at the Gambia Commercial and Development Bank in Banjul.

== Diplomatic and political career ==
Dabo entered politics after a brief stint as The Gambia’s High Commissioner to Senegal (1979–1981). He played a key role during the 1981 coup attempt in Banjul, he help to mobilise Senegalese support to restore order Ahead of the 1982 elections, Dabo replaced H. O. Semega-Janneh as the PPP candidate for Western Kiang. Although a newcomer to the party, he was elected as an MP and retained the seat until the 1994 coup. He was subsequently appointed Minister of Information, Broadcasting, and Tourism. After the 1982 election, Dabo was appointed vice president and later given additional portfolios, including Education, Youth, and Culture, after the 1987 elections. Dabo became a prominent figure in the PPP government, frequently regarded as a potential successor to President Dawda Jawara. Despite being a leading contender to succeed Jawara, factional disputes within the PPP led to his demotion to minister of finance and economic affairs after the 1992 elections.

== After 1994 Gambian coup d'état ==
During the July 1994 military coup that ousted the PPP government, Dabo initially fled to Dakar, Senegal. He returned in September 1994 to serve as minister of finance under the Armed Forces Provisional Ruling Council but resigned within a month. Dabo was later accused of being a "civilian instigator" of the failed November 1994 coup attempt. He flee once again and sought refuge first in Senegal and then in the United Kingdom,where he sought exile. He pursued legal studies and was called to the bar in 1998. During his exile, he became an active opponent of Yahya Jammeh’s regime.

== The founding of GAF ==
Dabo returned to The Gambia on March 15, 2017, following Jammeh’s electoral defeat. After his return he announced plans to pursue legal action in court to reclaim assets confiscated by the state during the regime of former dictator Yahya Jammeh. He later sought leadership of the PPP but was unsuccessful. In the year 2020, BB Darbo embarked on a new political journey, leading to the establishment of the Gambia For All (GFA) party. The party was officially launched on 8 February 2020, marking a significant milestone in Darbo's political career
