= Edward Singateh =

Gambian politician

Edward Singhateh

Vice-President of the Gambia
- In office 1996–1997
- President: Yahya Jammeh
- Preceded by: Position established
- Succeeded by: Isatou Njie-Saidy

Minister of Presidential Affairs
- In office 1997–2000

Minister of Works, Communication, and Information
- In office 2000–2003

Minister of Trade, Industry and Employment
- In office 2003–2005

Minister of Forestry and the Environment
- In office March 2005 – 13 September 2007

Personal details
- Born: Edward David Singhateh; 8 August 1968 (age 57) UK
- Occupation: Politician, Former Military Officer

Edward David Singhateh (born 8 August 1968) is a Gambian former military officer and politician who played a key role in the 1994 coup that brought Yahya Jammeh to power. He later served in various ministerial roles in the Gambian government before his dismissal in 2007.

== Early life and education ==
Singhateh was born on 8 August 1968 in The UK, to a Mandinka father and an English mother. He was raised in a Roman Catholic household and received his education at St. Augustine’s School in Banjul from 1982 to 1987. Singateh was born on 8 August 1968. He joined the army in 1991.

== Military career ==
After working as an electronic technician at the Civil Aviation Department between 1989 and 1990, Singhateh joined the Gambia National Army (GNA) as an officer cadet in January 1991. He later underwent military training in the United States and was commissioned as a second lieutenant in January 1992, serving as a platoon commander.

== 1994 Gambian coup d'état ==
Singhateh was one of the key leaders of the coup d'état on 22 July 1994, which overthrew President Dawda Jawara and established the Armed Forces Provisional Ruling Council (AFPRC). Following the coup, he was appointed Minister of Defence in the AFPRC government. He was also a member of the military junta Armed Forces Provisional Ruling Council, and hold the position of vice-chairman of the junta. In November 1994 Singateh was promoted to captain. Singhateh also played a crucial role in suppressing the attempted coup of November 1994. He was later promoted to vice chairman of the AFPRC in January 1995 after the removal of Sana Sabally and Sadibou Hydara. He left the military in September 1996 with the rank of captain, which he had received in November 1994.

== After the 1996 presidential election ==
After leaving the army Singhateh was appointed Vice President of The Gambia in 1996, serving until 1997. He then held multiple ministerial positions under President Yahya Jammeh:

- Minister of Presidential Affairs (1997–2000)
- Minister of Works, Communication, and Information (2000–2003)
- Minister of Trade, Industry, and Employment (2003–2005)
- Minister of Forestry and the Environment (March 2005 – September 2007)

In addition to his government roles Singateh served as general secretary of the Alliance for Patriotic Reorientation and Construction (APRC), a position which he had held since 1997.

== Dismissal and Later Life ==
In September 2007 Singhateh was dismissed from his ministerial position. Reports suggest he had attempted to resign earlier to pursue a law degree at the University of The Gambia. His dismissal coincided with the removal of his brother, Lieutenant Colonel Peter Singhateh, from his position as Deputy Commander of the Defence Staff. Once considered President Jammeh’s right-hand man, Singhateh was the only official to have continuously held a ministerial position since the 1994 coup. His removal marked a significant shift in the political landscape of The Gambia. His subsequent political career remained uncertain after his dismissal. After his political career ended, Singateh joined the judiciary in 2011.
