= 2017 in the Gambia =

- Decades: 1990s; 2000s; 2010s; 2020s
- See also: Other events of 2017; Timeline of Gambian history

The following lists events in the year 2017 in the Gambia.

== Incumbents ==
- President: Yahya Jammeh (until January); Adama Barrow (from 19 January)
- Chief Justice: Emmanuel Fagbenle (until 20 January), Hassan Bubacar Jallow (starting 15 February)

== Events ==
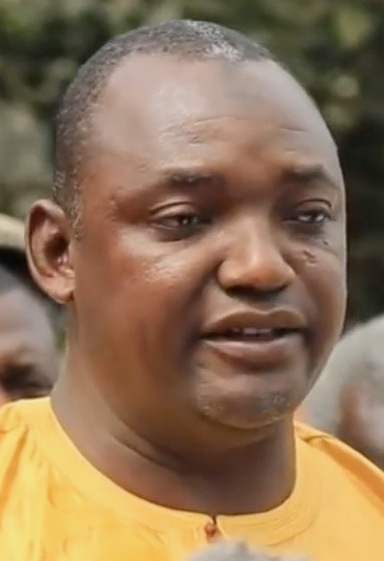
Adama Barrow, new president from January 2017

=== January ===
- 1 January - President Jammeh accuses the ECOWAS bloc of "declaring war" on the Gambia after it was said they were putting forces on alert in case he refuses to step down by the deadline of January 19.
- 13 January - The African Union declares that it will cease to recognise Jammeh as President after attempts to convince him to step down had failed.
- 14 January - President-elect Adama Barrow travels to Mali to discuss Jammeh after his refusal to step down.
- 17 January - Four ministers resign from the Cabinet of the Gambia while President Jammeh declares a 90-day state of emergency.
- 18 January - The National Assembly of the Gambia approves Jammeh's request to extend his presidency for 90 more days. As a result, thousands of British tourists are evacuated from the Gambia as West African countries begin to prepare for military action.
- 19 January – 2016-17 Gambian constitutional crisis
  - Adama Barrow is sworn in as the new President of the Gambia from the embassy in Senegal.
  - The invasion of the Gambia begins with Senegalese forces entering to end Jammeh's rule.
  - The United Nations Security Council Resolution 2337 was unanimously adopted by the United Nations Security Council (UNSC).
- 20 January - 2016-17 Gambian constitutional crisis
  - Chief of the Gambian army, Ousman Badjie, refuses to fight ECOWAS troops and recognises Barrow's legitimacy as President. Jammeh agrees to step down and go to exile, ending the crisis.
- 21 January - Jammeh reportedly leaves the Gambia for a plane to Guinea.
- 23 January - According to government officials, more than 500 million dalasi are missing from the state coffer after Jammeh left in exile.
- 24 January - Fatoumata Tambajang is named Vice President of the Gambia by President Barrow.
- 26 January -
  - Former interior minister, Ousman Sonko, is arrested in Geneva, Switzerland for human rights abuses.
  - President Barrow finally returns to the Gambia from Senegal effectively ending the crisis.
- 30 January - President Barrow removes the term "Islamic" from the country's name, reverting it back to "The Republic of the Gambia".

=== February ===
- 14 February - The Gambia is to rejoin the Commonwealth of Nations after four years of leaving it as Barrow's attempts to mend relations with the United Kingdom.
- 18 February - Adama Barrow is finally sworn in as President of the Gambia.

=== April ===
- 6 April - Voters go to the polls to vote in the first legislative election held since Jammeh left.
