= 2018 in the Gambia =

- Decades: 1990s; 2000s; 2010s; 2020s
- See also: Other events of 2018; Timeline of Gambian history

Events in the year 2018 in the Gambia.

== Incumbents ==
- President: Adama Barrow
- Vice-President of the Gambia: Fatoumata Tambajang
- Chief Justice: Hassan Bubacar Jallow

== Events ==
=== February ===
- 8 February - The Gambia rejoins the Commonwealth of Nations, after former President Yahya Jammeh withdrew from it five years ago calling it a "neocolonial institution", to rebuild the Gambia's image.

=== April ===
- 1 April - President Barrow accuses supporters of former President Jammeh of supporting rebels in Senegal's Casamance region.

== Deaths ==
- 2 March – Omar Sey, politician and sports administrator (b. 1941).
