= Hydara =

Hydara may refer to:

- Deyda Hydara (1946–2004), Gambian journalist and murder victim
- Sadibou Hydara (1964–1995), Gambian military officer and politician
- Hydara (bug), a genus of bugs in the family Coreidae
- Hydara (moth), a synonym for a genus of moths, Psaliodes
