= Belinda Bidwell =

Gambian politician (1936–2007)

Speaker of National Assembly
- In office March 2006 – January 2007
- Preceded by: Sheriff Mustapha Dibba
- Succeeded by: Fatoumata Jahumpa Ceesay

Personal details
- Born: 22 April 1936
- Died: 28 April 2007 (aged 71)
- Party: Alliance for Patriotic Reorientation and Construction

Belinda Bidwell (22 April 1936 – 28 April 2007) was the first female speaker of the National Assembly of The Gambia. In 2002, Bidwell, who was previously a teacher, was nominated to serve in the National Assembly, and she became deputy speaker. In April 2006, following an attempted coup d'etat in March, Speaker Sheriff Mustapha Dibba was arrested and removed from his position for alleged involvement, and Bidwell became speaker.

Bidwell died of a heart attack in April 2007.

== Early life ==
Bidwell was the second daughter of Gabriel Julian Faal and Matilda Ann Faal, born on 22 April 1936. She had her primary education at Saint Joseph Convent, collegiate education at Gambia College and graduation at the University of Oxford in the UK. After completing education, she served as a teacher at St. Joseph Convent, St. Augustine Junior Secondary School and Gambia College. She had various degrees in Mathematics and environment protection from University of Chicago, US, University of Reading in the UK and at other universities in Australia, the Soviet Union and Germany. She was married to James Ndow and the pair had three sons and two daughters.

== Political life ==
Bidwell was nominated to serve in the National Assembly in 2002 by Alliance for Patriotic Reorientation and Construction, and she went on to become the deputy speaker. In April 2006, following an attempted coup d'etat in March, Speaker Sheriff Mustapha Dibba was arrested and removed from his position for alleged involvement, and Bidwell became speaker. Fatoumatta Jahumpa Ceesay replaced Bidwell as speaker in February 2007, Bidwell died of a heart attack in April 2007.
