= 2001 Gambian presidential election =

- 18 October 2001
- Registered: 509,301
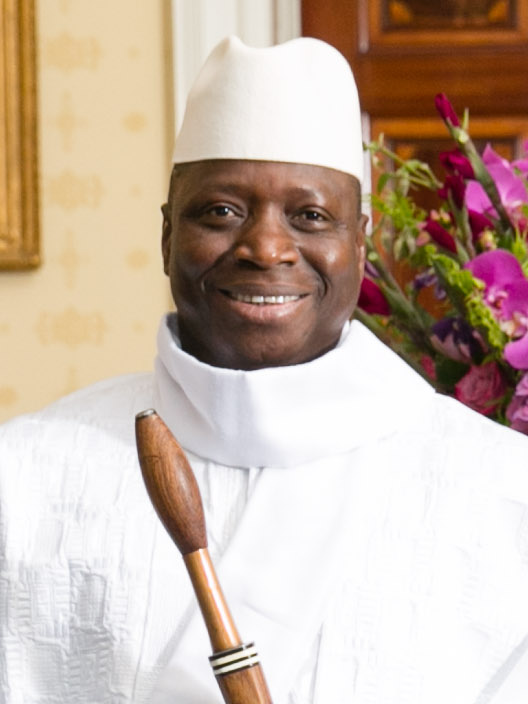

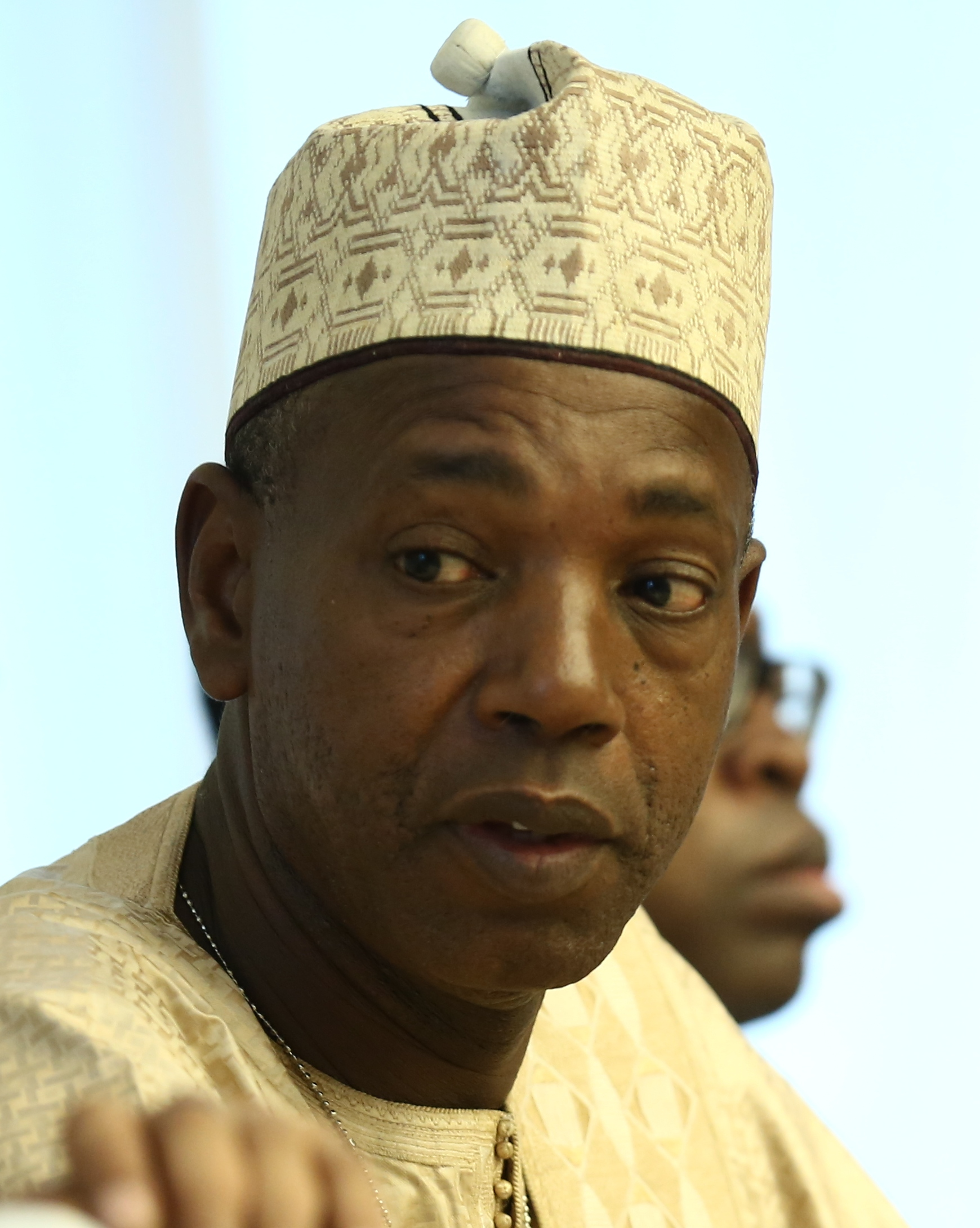
Nominee	Yahya Jammeh	Ousainou Darboe	Hamat Bah
Party	APRC	UDP	NRP
Popular vote	242,302	149,448	35,671
Percentage	52.84%	32.59%	7.78%
- Results by region
President before election
Yahya Jammeh
APRC
Elected President
Yahya Jammeh
APRC

Presidential elections were held in the Gambia on 18 October 2001. The result was a victory for the incumbent Yahya Jammeh, who received 53% of the vote.

The elections were marred by irregularities and repression of the opposition; Pre-election violence resulted in the death of an unarmed opposition supporter who was shot by a police officer, and several injuries. The government also expelled a British diplomat who had attended an opposition rally.

== Results ==
Candidate	Party	Votes	%
Yahya Jammeh	Alliance for Patriotic Reorientation and Construction	242,302	52.84
Ousainou Darboe	United Democratic Party	149,448	32.59
Hamat Bah	National Reconciliation Party	35,671	7.78
Sheriff Mustapha Dibba	National Convention Party	17,271	3.77
Sidia Jatta	People's Democratic Organisation for Independence and Socialism	13,841	3.02
Total		458,533	100.00
Total votes		457,484	–
Registered voters/turnout		509,301	89.83
Source: IEC
