= 1996 Gambian presidential election =

- 29 September 1996
- Registered: 446,541
- Turnout: 88.35%
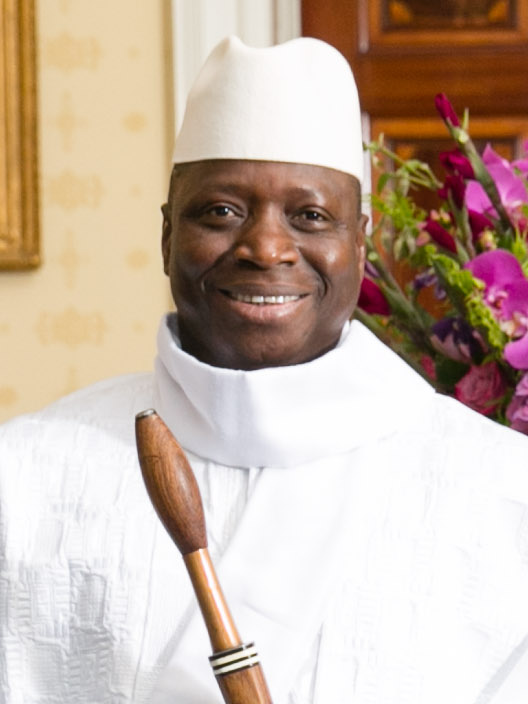

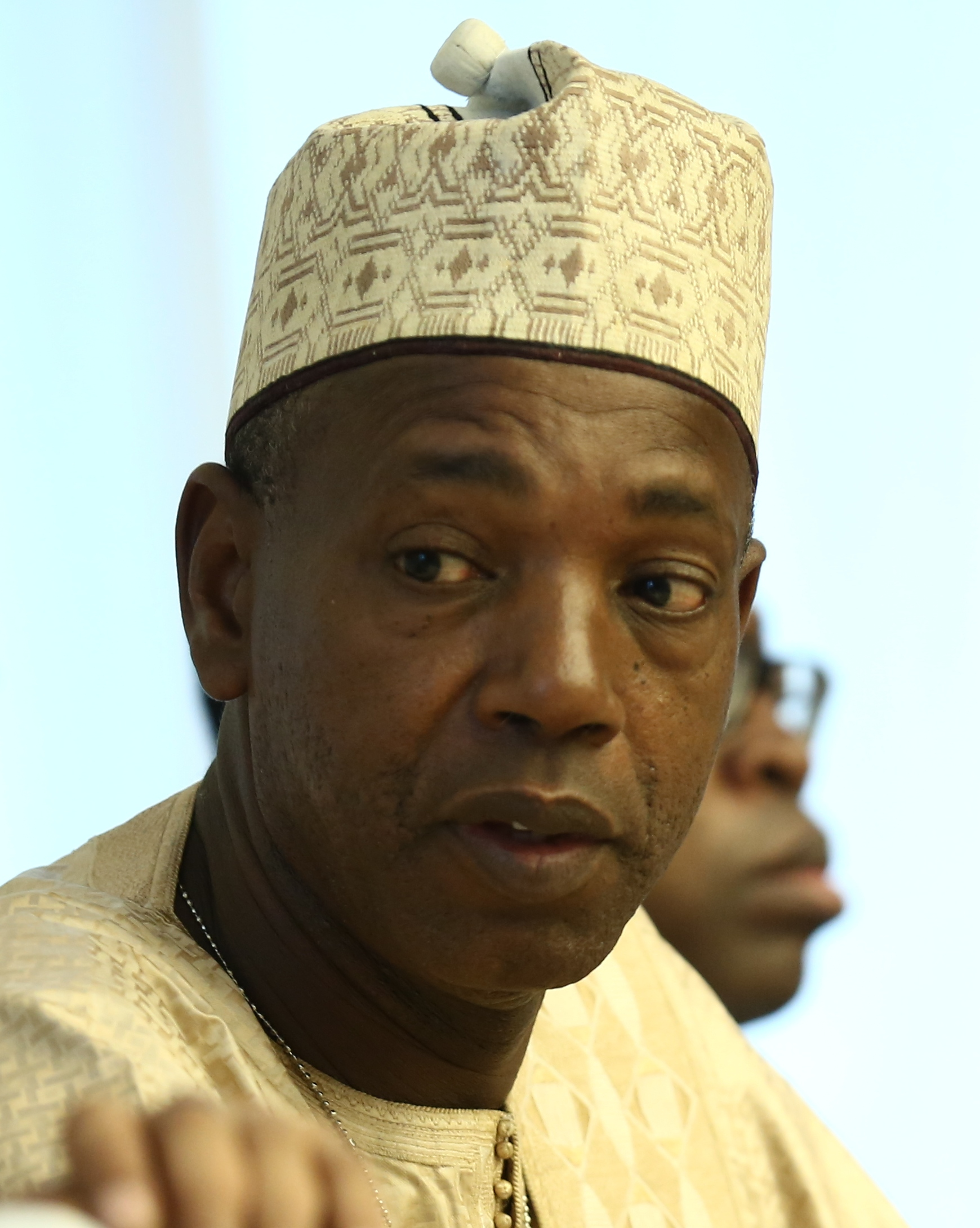
Nominee	Yahya Jammeh	Ousainou Darboe	Hamat Bah
Party	APRC	UDP	NRP
Popular vote	220,011	114,177	21,759
Percentage	55.77%	35.84%	5.52%
President before election
Yahya Jammeh
Military (AFPRC)
Elected President
Yahya Jammeh
APRC

Presidential elections were held in the Gambia on 29 September 1996. The first since the 1994 military coup led by Yahya Jammeh, they were also the first elections to be held under the new constitution, and the first presidential elections held separately from parliamentary elections. Voter turnout was exceptionally high, with 88% of the 446,541 registered voters voting.

Despite originally stating that he did not intend to run, Jammeh entered the race shortly before the elections. He emerged victorious with 55.8% of the vote, winning the most votes in every district except Mansa Konko (where UDP candidate Ousainou Darboe was the most voted-for).

The elections were criticised as unfair due to government crackdowns on journalists and opposition leaders at the time, as well as fraud and other irregularities. Political parties that existed prior to the 1994 coup were not allowed to compete.

== Results ==
Candidate	Party	Votes	%
Yahya Jammeh	Alliance for Patriotic Reorientation and Construction	220,011	55.77
Ousainou Darboe	United Democratic Party	141,387	35.84
Hamat Bah	National Reconciliation Party	21,759	5.52
Sidia Jatta	People's Democratic Organisation for Independence and Socialism	11,337	2.87
Total		394,494	100.00
Valid votes		394,494	99.99
Invalid/blank votes		43	0.01
Total votes		394,537	100.00
Registered voters/turnout		446,541	88.35
Source: IEC

The number of invalid votes was extremely low due to the country's unique voting system of putting marbles into drums, which meant that almost no votes were rejected.
