= 2025 in the Gambia =

- Decades: 2000s; 2010s; 2020s
- See also: Other events of 2025; Timeline of Gambian history

Events in the year 2025 in the Gambia.

== Incumbents ==
- President: Adama Barrow
- Vice-President of the Gambia: Muhammad B.S. Jallow
- Chief Justice: Hassan Bubacar Jallow

== Events ==
- 15 April – Michael Sang Correa, a former member of the Gambia Armed Forces, is convicted in the United States of torturing five people accused of involvement in a 2006 coup attempt against then-president Yahya Jammeh.
- 5 May – Twenty-nine people, including two journalists, are arrested following protests against allegations of misconduct over the sale of assets seized from former president Yahya Jammeh.
- 22 July – 2023–2025 mpox epidemic: The first case of mpox is reported in the country with the government declaring an outbreak.
- 23 July – Protests break out in Banjul following several corruption scandals.
- 10 August – A one-month-old infant dies after being subjected to female genital mutilation in Wellingara, resulting in two arrests.
- 7 November – Cameroonian opposition leader Issa Tchiroma flees to the Gambia due to safety concerns and is granted asylum.
- 29 November – A suspect in the 2004 murder of journalist Deyda Hydara is arrested in Senegal. He is extradited to the Gambia on December 2.
- 16 December – US President Donald Trump issues a proclamation imposing partial travel restrictions on Gambian nationals travelling to the United States.

== Holidays ==
- 1 January – New Year's Day
- 18 February – Independence Day
- 30 March – Koriteh
- 18 April – Good Friday
- 21 April – Easter Monday
- 1 May – Labour Day
- 9 May – Ascension Day
- 25 May – Africa Day
- 6 June – Tabaski
- 6 July – Ashura
- 22 July – Revolution Day
- 15 August – Assumption Day
- 4 September – The Prophet's Birthday
- 1 November – All Saints' Day
- 25 December – Christmas Day
