= Sheriff Mustapha Dibba =

Gambian politician (1937–2008)

1st Vice-President of the Gambia
- In office 24 April 1970 – 15 September 1972
- President: Dawda Jawara
- Preceded by: Position established
- Succeeded by: Assan Musa Camara

Speaker of the National Assembly of the Gambia
- In office 2002–2006
- President: Yahya Jammeh
- Preceded by: Mustapha B. Wadda
- Succeeded by: Belinda Bidwell

Personal details
- Born: 10 January 1937 Salikene, Central Baddibu, The Gambia
- Died: 2 June 2008 (aged 71) Banjul, The Gambia
- Party: National Convention Party (after 1975)
- Other political affiliations: People's Progressive Party (until 1975)

Sheriff Mustapha Dibba (10 January 1937 – 2 June 2008) was a Gambian politician who was the 1st Vice-President of the Gambia from 1970 to 1972 and the Speaker of the National Assembly of the Gambia from 2002 to 2006. He was also the founding leader of the National Convention Party (NCP).

== Early life and education ==
Dibba was the son of Mustapha Dibba, a Mandinka chief and farmer. His father would later become the district chief of Central Baddibu in 1967. He was born in Salikene, Central Baddibu in January 1937.

Dibba was educated at Armitage High School and then at the Methodist Boys High School in Bathurst from 1955 to 1957. He briefly worked as a clerk for the United Africa Company before resigning in 1959 to work for the recently formed People's Progressive Party (PPP). He organized the party's youth wing and was elected to the House of Representatives as representative for the Central Baddibu constituency in the 1962 election. After the 1966 elections, he was appointed Minister of Works and Communications and replaced Sheriff Sisay as Minister of Finance of the Gambia in December 1967.

== Vice presidency (1970–1972) ==
When Gambia became a republic after the 1970 referendum, Dibba was appointed as the Gambia's first vice president and continued to serve as finance minister.

Dibba resigned from his position on 15 September 1972, as a result from the butut scandal, during which his younger brother Kutubo was arrested for smuggling Gambian currency and contraband goods to neighbouring Senegal in August 1972 and was found to have been working out of Sheriff Dibba's official residence, No. 1 Marina.

== Post-vice presidency ==
In October 1972, Dibba was appointed as Gambia's first ambassador to the European Economic Community, but was recalled from Brussels by President Jawara in July 1974 and appointed as Minister of Economic Planning and Industrial Development. In late July 1975, Jawara accused Dibba of trying to unseat him through a cabinet revolt and Dibba was dismissed immediately. Dibba was later sacked from the PPP in August 1975. In response, Dibba later formed the National Convention Party (NCP) in 1975. Following the 1977 general elections, the NCP became the main opposition party in the Gambia.

Dibba was arrested in August 1981, along with several other NCP members and activists, and incarcerated for his alleged involvement in the failed coup attempt that year, but was freed after 11 months in detention in July 1982. The first direct presidential elections were held on 4 May 1982, months after a constitutional amendment. Dibba ran as the NCP presidential candidate but was defeated by the incumbent Dawda Jawara. He ran again as the NCP candidate in 1987 and 1992, placing second to Jawara both times.

Following the overthrow of the Jawara government in 1994, the NCP and other political parties were banned. The ban on the NCP was lifted in mid-2001 and Dibba ran for president a fourth time at the presidential elections held on 18 October of that year. He was defeated by incumbent president Yahya Jammeh and placed fourth out of five candidates, winning 3.8% of the vote.

Dibba then gave his support to Jammeh and his party, the Alliance for Patriotic Reorientation and Construction, and after the 2002 legislative elections, he was elected Speaker of the National Assembly at the first meeting of the new legislature on 3 February.

In 2006, Dibba was detained for nine days. He was purportedly involved in a plot to overthrow Jammeh. After his nine-day detainment, he was freed and no official charges were made against him. His detention was part of a larger campaign against groups that seemed to pose a threat to Jammeh's authority. Dibba himself was over 65 years old by this time and was therefore not eligible to run. Nevertheless, after his release, Dibba reaffirmed his loyalty to president Jammeh. He later retired from politics prior to his death.

== Death ==
Dibba died from a heart attack at the Royal Victoria Teaching Hospital (RVTH) in Banjul on the morning of 2 June 2008, aged 71, after being hospitalized on 30 May.
