= 1992 Gambian general election =

- 29 April 1992
- Presidential election
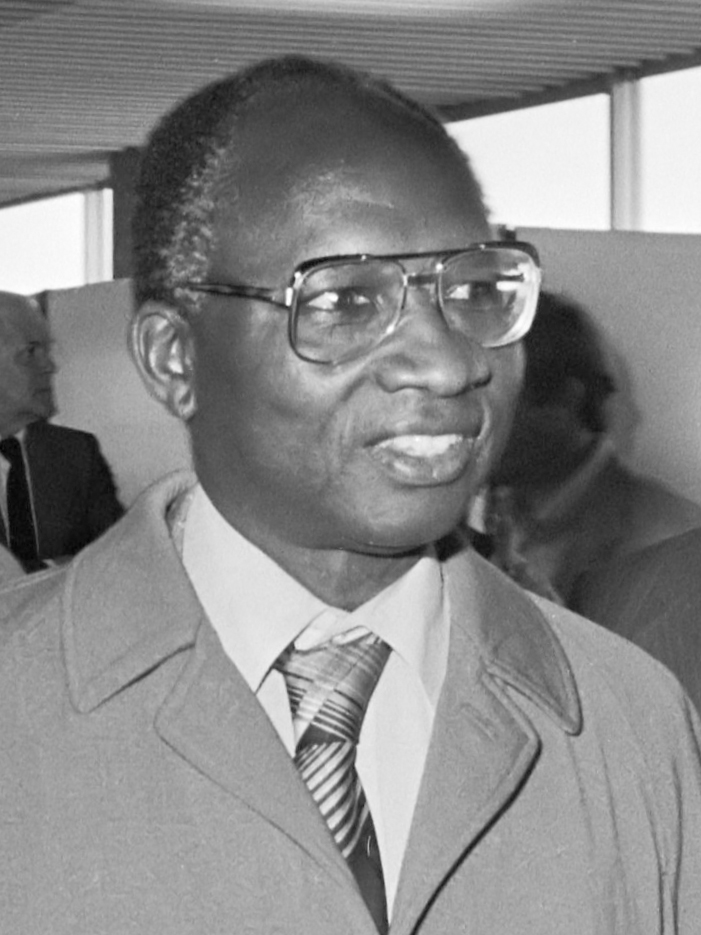

Nominee	Dawda Jawara	Sheriff Dibba	Assan Musa Camara
Party	PPP	NCP	GPP
Popular vote	117,549	44,639	16,287
Percentage	58.48%	22.21%	8.10%
Nominee	Lamin Bojang	Sidia Jatta
Party	PDP	PDOIS
Popular vote	11,999	10,543
Percentage	5.97%	5.24%
- Results by region
President before election
Dawda Jawara
PPP
Elected President
Dawda Jawara
PPP

General elections were held in the Gambia on 29 April 1992. The election date was announced on 14 February and the National Assembly was dissolved three days later. Although he had announced his retirement in December 1991, President Dawda Jawara changed his mind and ran for the position again. Both elections were won by the ruling People's Progressive Party (PPP), with Jawara remaining president after receiving 58% of the vote.

== Campaign ==
A total of 130 candidates ran for the 36 elected seats, although the PPP was the only one with a candidate in every seat. The opposition campaign centred on corruption and economic mismanagement, whilst the PPP promised it would boost the tourism industry and support groundnut farmers.

== Results ==
=== President ===
Candidate	Party	Votes	%
Dawda Jawara	People's Progressive Party	117,549	58.48
Sheriff Mustapha Dibba	National Convention Party	44,639	22.21
Assan Musa Camara	Gambian People's Party	16,287	8.10
Lamin Bojang	People's Democratic Party	11,999	5.97
Sidia Jatta	People's Democratic Organisation for Independence and Socialism	10,543	5.24
Total		201,017	100.00
Registered voters/turnout		338,739	–
Source: Hughes & Perfect

=== National Assembly ===
Party	Votes	%	Seats	+/–
People's Progressive Party	109,059	54.23	25	–6
National Convention Party	45,953	22.85	6	+1
Gambian People's Party	13,937	6.93	2	+2
People's Democratic Party	9,291	4.62	0	New
People's Democratic Organisation for Independence and Socialism	4,632	2.30	0	0
United Party	2,892	1.44	0	0
Independents	15,331	7.62	3	+3
Presidential appointees			8	0
Paramount chiefs' representatives			5	0
Attorney General			1	0
Total	201,095	100.00	50	+1
Registered voters/turnout	338,739	–		
Source: Hughes & Perfect
