= Solo Sandeng =

Gambian democracy activist

Ebrima Solo Sandeng (Solo Sandeng) (b. 1959) was a Gambian political activist and a member of the United Democratic Party.

In April 2016, Sandeng led a demonstration against the administration of president Yahya Jammeh, demanding electoral reforms.

Sandeng was tortured and murdered by operatives of the Gambian government. He died on 14 April 2016.
