= Alieu Badara Njie =

Alieu Badara Njie CMG MBE JP

Vice-President of the Gambia
- In office 1977–1981
- Preceded by: Assan Musa Camara
- Succeeded by: Assan Musa Camara

Personal details
- Born: 17 October 1904 Bathurst, Gambia
- Died: 21 April 1982 (aged 77)

Alieu Badara Njie (17 October 1904 – 21 April 1982) was a Gambian statesman who served as the 3rd Vice-President of the Gambia from 1977 to 1981. He served as the first Gambian Ambassador to Senegal and in Dawda Jawara's first cabinet. He held several ministerial roles under Jawara and played a key role in securing Gambian independence. He was Minister of Foreign Affairs from 1965–1967 and 1974–77, Minister of Communications from 1960–1961 and 1963–1965, Minister of Works from 1962–1965, Minister of Information from 1970–1971, and Minister of Agriculture from 1972–1974.

== Early life ==
He was born into a Wolof family in Bathurst (now Banjul). Njie attended the Methodist Boys' High School (1922–25) before entering the civil service in 1925.

== Career ==
Njie worked in the civil service until his retirement in 1958 as the registrar of the Supreme Court of the Gambia.

He was first elected to the Bathurst Town Council in 1949 as an independent for the Jollof/Portuguese Town ward and, in 1960, was selected to contest the seat for the Democratic Congress Alliance (DCA) in the first parliamentary election. He won the same seat in the 1962 election.

He transferred to Northern Kombo for the 1966 election and all subsequent ones up to 1977. Following the merger of the DCA and the People's Progressive Party (PPP) in 1965, he contested these later elections for the PPP.

== Ministerial roles ==
After the 1960 election, Njie was appointed Minister of Communications by Governor Edward Windley, but resigned in March 1961 when P.S. Njie was selected as chief minister. Following the 1962 election, he was appointed minister of works in D.K. Jawara's first cabinet and communications was added to this portfolio in 1963. At independence in 1965, he was appointed Minister of State for External Affairs and first ever Resident Minister in Dakar (Jawara initially retained the foreign policy portfolio for himself). In April 1967, he again became Minister for External Affairs, but was replaced by Andrew Camara in January 1968.

Following a period of out of the cabinet, he was appointed Minister of Information in 1970 and, in 1971, he became Minister of State in the President's Office. In 1972, he became Minister of Agriculture and Natural Resources, before returning to External Affairs in July 1974, a post he held until the 1977 election. After the election, he was made Vice President in 1977 (a largely ceremonial post). He resigned as a minister in August 1978.

Before the 1982 election he voluntarily retired as a member of parliament for Northern Kombo, supporting and garnering support for Nyimasata Sanneh-Bojang. He was persuaded to lead the PPP election campaign, until he was killed on 21 April 1982 in the crash of a helicopter owned French Government.

== Retirement and death ==
Njie retired from ministerial duties in August 1978. Before the 1982 election, he was asked to step aside as the Member of Parliament for Northern Kombo to allow Nyimasata Sanneh-Bojang to run for the seat. Despite his retirement, he remained active in politics and led the PPP election campaign. Njie died in a helicopter crash on 21 April 1982 while campaigning for Jawara's re-election.

== Titles ==
- Member of the Most Excellent Order of the British Empire (MBE) (1955)
- The Most Distinguished Order of St Michael and St George (CMG)
- Justice of the Peace (JP)
