= 2006 Gambian presidential election =

- 22 September 2006
- Registered: 670,336
- Turnout: 58.6%
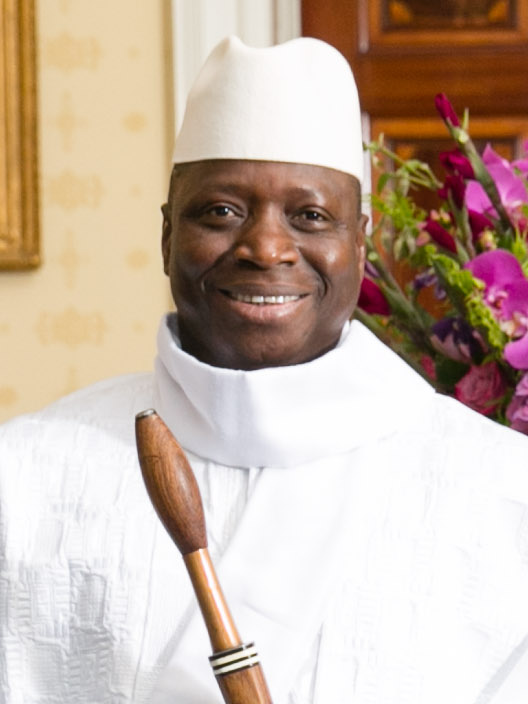

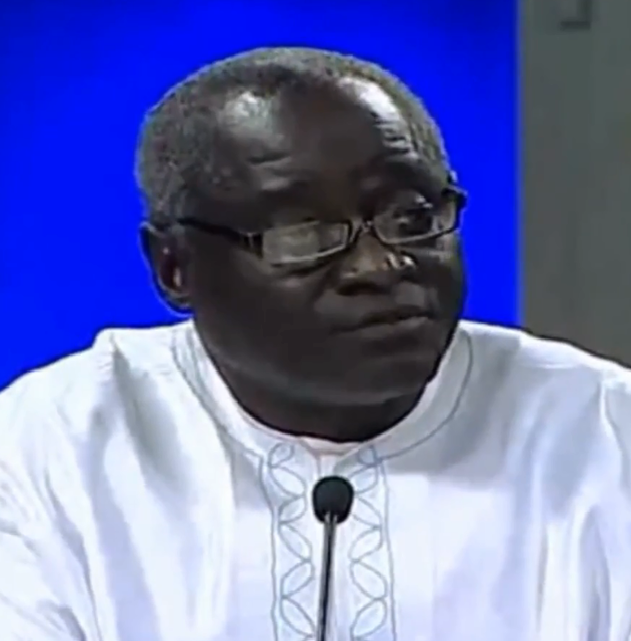
Nominee	Yahya Jammeh	Ousainou Darboe	Halifa Sallah
Party	APRC	UDP	PDOIS
Alliance	—	ARC	NADD
Popular vote	264,404	104,808	23,473
Percentage	67.33%	26.69%	5.98%
President before election
Yahya Jammeh
APRC
Elected President
Yahya Jammeh
APRC

Presidential elections were held in the Gambia on 22 September 2006. Incumbent President Yahya Jammeh was re-elected with 67.3% of the vote. Ousainou Darboe, who finished second with 27% of the vote, rejected the official results, saying that the elections had not been free and fair and that there was widespread voter intimidation.

== Electoral system ==
All the 989 polling booths used marbles, which were inserted into candidate drums instead of ballot papers due to the high illiteracy rate. The marble system is only used in Gambia, where it has been used since 1965.

== Results ==
Candidate	Party	Votes	%
Yahya Jammeh	Alliance for Patriotic Reorientation and Construction	264,404	67.33
Ousainou Darboe	United Democratic Party	104,808	26.69
Halifa Sallah	National Alliance for Democracy and Development	23,473	5.98
Total		392,685	100.00
Valid votes		392,685	99.97
Invalid/blank votes		124	0.03
Total votes		392,809	100.00
Registered voters/turnout		670,336	58.60
Source: IEC
