= National Convention Party (The Gambia) =

Political party in the Gambia

- Leader: Abubacarr M. A. Kinteh
- Founder: Sheriff Mustapha Dibba
- Founded: 1975
- Split from: People's Progressive Party
- Political position: Centre-left

The National Convention Party (NCP) is a centre-left political party in the Gambia. It was the main opposition party between 1975 and 1994. It was originally founded on 7 September 1975 when it first launched at Busumbala by former vice-president Sheriff Mustapha Dibba two weeks after his expulsion from the People's Progressive Party (PPP). The party is currently led by Abubacarr M. A. Kinteh.

== History ==
When the NCP was first established, then-incumbent president Dawda Jawara of the PPP predicted that the party would not last more than three months. Sheriff Dibba ran as the NCP presidential candidate in every election from 1982 to 1992, each time finishing second to Jawara.

The NCP initially welcomed the 1994 coup but was banned from participating in elections in August that year. Prior to the 1992 elections, the party faced a series of setbacks as many of its leaders rejoined the PPP. Its candidate at the 2001 presidential election, Sheriff Dibba, came fourth with 3.77% of the popular vote. The NCP was part of Coalition 2016 for the 2016 presidential election, where it endorsed opposition candidate Adama Barrow who would eventually go on to win the election.

== Electoral history ==
=== Presidential elections ===
Election	Party candidate	Votes	%	Result
1982	Sheriff Mustapha Dibba	52,136	27.56%	Lost ✗
1987	Sheriff Mustapha Dibba	57,343	27.51%	Lost ✗
1992	Sheriff Mustapha Dibba	44,639	22.21%	Lost ✗
2001	Sheriff Mustapha Dibba	17,271	3.77%	Lost ✗

=== National Assembly elections ===
Election	Leader	Votes	%	Seats	+/–	Position	Position
1977	Sheriff Mustapha Dibba	40,212	22.70%	5 / 35	New	▲2nd	Opposition
1982	Sheriff Mustapha Dibba	32,634	19.65%	3 / 35	▼2	2nd	Opposition
1987	Sheriff Mustapha Dibba	55,251	26.11%	4 / 36	▲1	2nd	Opposition
1992	Sheriff Mustapha Dibba	45,953	22.85%	6 / 36	▲2	2nd	Opposition
The NCP did not participate in parliamentary elections from 1997 to 2017
2017	Abubacarr M. A. Kinteh	1,773	0.47%	0 / 58	0	—N/a	Extra-parliamentary
