= 2024 in the Gambia =

- Decades: 2000s; 2010s; 2020s
- See also: Other events of 2024; Timeline of Gambian history

Events in the year 2024 in the country of Gambia.

== Incumbents ==
- President: Adama Barrow
- Vice-President of the Gambia: Muhammad B.S. Jallow
- Chief Justice: Hassan Bubacar Jallow

== Events ==
- 11 January – A chartered Air Côte d'Ivoire flight from The Gambia to the Ivory Coast, transporting the Gambia national football team to the 2023 Africa Cup of Nations, makes an emergency landing in Banjul due to a loss of cabin pressure lasting for more than nine minutes. All passengers suffer some degree of carbon monoxide poisoning including loss of consciousness.
- 15 May – Former interior minister Ousman Sonko is convicted and sentenced to 20 years' imprisonment by a Swiss court for his role in murder, torture and other human rights abuses during the dictatorship of Yahya Jammeh.
- 15 July – The National Assembly votes against the passage of the Women’s (Amendment) Bill 2024, which sought to overturn a ban on female genital mutilation that was enacted in 2015.
- 9 October – The Gambia is elected to a seat at the United Nations Human Rights Council for a three-year term beginning in 2025.
- 15 December – ECOWAS approves the establishment of a special court to investigate crimes committed during the dictatorship of Yahya Jammeh.

== Holidays ==
- 1 January - New Year's Day
- 18 February - Independence Day
- 1 April - Easter Monday
- 10 April – Koriteh
- 1 May - Labour Day
- 9 May - Ascension Day
- 25 May - Africa Day
- 16 June – Tabaski
- 16 July – Ashura
- 22 July – Revolution Day
- 15 August - Assumption Day
- 15 September – The Prophet's Birthday
- 1 November - All Saints' Day
- 25 December - Christmas Day
