= Fatou Jallow =

Gambian beauty queen

- Born: Fatou A. Jallow; April 19, 1996 (age 30); Soma, The Gambia
- Education: The Gambia College
- Occupations: Beauty queen, social worker
- Years active: 2014–present
- Known for: Sexual violence allegations against Yahya Jammeh
- Title: Miss July 22

Fatou A. "Toufah" Jallow (born April 19, 1996 in Soma) is a Gambian beauty queen. She became known in 2014 for her accusations of rape and sexual harassment against Gambian President Yahya Jammeh.

== Life ==
Jallow belongs to the Fulbe ethnic group. Her parents are Alpha Jallow and Awa Saho. She attended Nusrat Senior Secondary School up through 12th grade.

In 2014, she won the title of Miss July 22 in the national beauty pageant organized by Gambian Dictator Yahya Jammeh. At this time she was 18 years old.

In September 2014 she started a teacher training course at The Gambia College in Brikama.

According to a story in Kibaroo News in June 2015, she went missing for several weeks after being invited to the State House in Banjul. In the period after the competition, Jammeh was accused of repeatedly sexually harassing her and offering her gifts. According to the report, she was brought to Jammeh several times against her will. He had publicly announced several times that he wanted to marry Jallow, a proposal she refused.

As Jallow explained in 2019, in July 2015 she fled over the border to Dakar (Senegal), where she turned to human rights organizations. On August 6, 2015, she received asylum in Canada and since then has lived in Toronto. There she completed therapy and studied social work. Around 2019 she worked as a customer service representative for a telecommunications company and was involved in a women's refuge.

=== Rape allegations ===
At the end of June 2019, she accused to the human rights organizations Human Rights Watch and TRIAL that Jammeh had raped her. Jallow's name was mentioned at her request in order to encourage other women to report on such experiences.

After winning the beauty competition on December 6, 2014, she said that she was invited to visit Jammeh several times in the following months. According to her statement, she received 50,000 Dalasi, and later another 200,000 Dalasi from him.

=== Reactions ===
Jammeh himself did not comment on the allegations. Ousman Rambo Jatta, party official of the Jammeh-founded Alliance for Patriotic Reorientation and Construction, called the allegations a lie, stating that Jammeh "is very respectable God-fearing and pious leader who has nothing but respect for our Gambian women." A driver at the time also denied Jallow's allegations of rape.

The Gambian Justice Minister and Attorney General, Abubacarr Tambadou, and Salieu Taal, President of the Gambia Bar Association (GBA), commended Jallow for her courage in breaking her silence, and encouraged other victims of rape to speak out, in the hope that they would provide the basis for more charges to be filed against Jammeh. Women's rights organization Female Lawyers Association Gambia (FLAG) joined them in this view. Further accusations against high-ranking politicians were reported in the following days.

In September 2019, the APRC's interim leader, Fabakary Jatta, called the allegations a lie, saying that Jallow "should even be thankful to ex-president Jammeh for the monetary support", and denounced the allegations as attempts to tarnish Jammeh's image. Jallow rejected this statement as unsubstantiated attention-seeking, and noted that she had not accused the APRC as a party, but Jammeh personally, and that the APRC should not speak for him.

On October 31, 2019, Jallow testified before the Truth, Reconciliation and Reparations Commission to come to terms with Jammeh's reign, and repeated and clarified her accusations.

She has published, together with Kim Pattaway, a book Toufah, The Woman Who Inspired an African #MeToo Movement".
