= 2021 in the Gambia =

- Decades: 2000s; 2010s; 2020s
- See also: Other events of 2021; Timeline of Gambian history

Events in the year 2021 in the Gambia.

== Incumbents ==
- President: Adama Barrow
- Vice-President of the Gambia: Isatou Touray
- Chief Justice: Hassan Bubacar Jallow

== Events ==
Ongoing — COVID-19 pandemic in the Gambia

- 4 January – Musu Bakoto Sawo, 30, ("Think Young Women") is chosen as 2020 Daily Trust "African of the Year". She lectures at the Faculty of Law, University of the Gambia.
- 4 December – 2021 Gambian presidential election.
