= Jammeh Foundation for Peace =

Gambian organization

The Jammeh Foundation for Peace (JFP) is an independent, non-political, charitable organization based in the Gambia, West Africa. The foundation was founded in 1999 by Gambian president Yahya Jammeh.

== Mission ==
The mission of the foundation is to implement substantial and sustainable improvements in the quality of life for the people of the Gambia. To accomplish this, the foundation provides programs in education, health, agriculture, women's issues, and youth development.

== History ==
The foundation was the brainchild of Gambian president Yahya Jammeh and his wife, First Lady Zineb Jammeh. It was launched in May 1999. Zineb Jammeh serves as the president of the foundation.

== News ==
In May 2011, the national Gambia Police Force (GPF) gave a substantial donation to the foundation. In a ceremony at its headquarters, the GPF donated 31 bags of farm produce, including 7 bags of groundnuts, 7 bags of coos, 11 bags of maize and 6 bags of rice.

In September 2011, Saudi Arabian princess Ameera bint Aidan bin Nayef Al-Taweel visited the Gambia and toured the foundation. The foundation donated $500,000 for the construction of a health diagnostic center. During her tour, Al-Taweel pledged $100,000 to the Foundation.

After Jammeh was removed from power, Reuters released a report on 24 February 2017 in which it stated that funds from the Jammeh Foundation for Peace went to Jammeh himself, not to the foundation's projects.
