= 2020 in the Gambia =

- Decades: 2000s; 2010s; 2020s
- See also: Other events of 2020; Timeline of Gambian history

Events in the year 2020 in the Gambia.

== Incumbents ==
- President: Adama Barrow
- Vice-President of the Gambia: Isatou Touray
- Chief Justice: Hassan Bubacar Jallow

== Events ==
- 17 March – First confirmed case of COVID-19 in the Gambia

== Deaths ==
- 24 January - Demba Sowe, politician, member of the national assembly (b. 1972)
- 4 April - Ousman B. Conateh, sports executives and administrators (b. 1937)
- 9 June - Ebrima „Mbat“ Jobe, national basketballplayer (b. ≈ 1950)
- 28 June – Louis Mahoney, Gambian-born British actor (b. 1938).
- 19 July – Biri Biri, footballer (b. 1948).

== See also ==
- COVID-19 pandemic in the Gambia
