= 2006 in the Gambia =

- Decades: 1980s; 1990s; 2000s; 2010s; 2020s
- See also: Other events of 2006; Timeline of Gambian history

The following lists events that happened during 2006 in the Gambia.

== Incumbents ==
- President: Yahya Jammeh
- Chief Justice: Stephen Alan Brobbey (until February 6) Abdou Kareem Savage (starting February 22)

== Events ==
=== June ===
- June 15 - Hundreds are wounded in fighting between rival factions of the Movement of the Democratic Forces of Casamance led by Salif Sadio, who supports the continuation of the Casamance conflict, and Magne Dieme, who supports reconciliation with the government of Senegal. The fighting has spread to the Gambia and Guinea-Bissau may intervene.
