= Mile 2 Prison =

Prison in The Gambia

- Mile 2 Prison (The Gambia)
- Interactive map of Mile 2 Prison
- Location: Banjul, The Gambia; 13°27′51″N 16°36′12.8″W
- Status: Open
- Capacity: 500 inmates

Mile 2 Prison is a penal institution in the West African country of The Gambia that is located on the highway between Serrekunda and the capital city of Banjul, across the road from a military barracks. Officially known as Central State Prison, the facility is notorious for its harsh conditions, torture by guards, and its use in holding political opponents of former President Yahya Jammeh.

Opened in 1920 by British colonial authorities, the prison contains a 'remand wing' where juvenile offenders and those awaiting trial are held, and a 'security wing' which houses high security prisoners, including those on death row, political prisoners, and other convicted inmates. Torture and other mistreatment is rampant inside the prison's security wing with some inmates reporting beatings, not being allowed to leave their cells for months at a time, lack of adequate medical treatment leading to the spread of disease, mosquitoes, and forbidden contact with family. According to a former prisoner, most prisoners are only allowed four thirty-minute visits a year while those on death row are not allowed any, and deaths are rife, usually the result of preventable disease.

In 2009, two British missionaries were jailed in Mile 2 Prison on charges of sedition after writing a letter critical of the government. On 23 August 2012, nine inmates were ordered to be executed by lethal injection on the orders of Yahya Jammeh, including one inmate whose death sentence had recently been commuted to life. These were the first executions to be carried out in Gambia since 1981.

== See also ==
- Black Beach
- Politics of the Gambia
- State House of the Gambia
- 1994 Gambian coup d'état
