= 1987 Gambian general election =

- 11 March 1987
- Registered: 262,593
- Presidential election
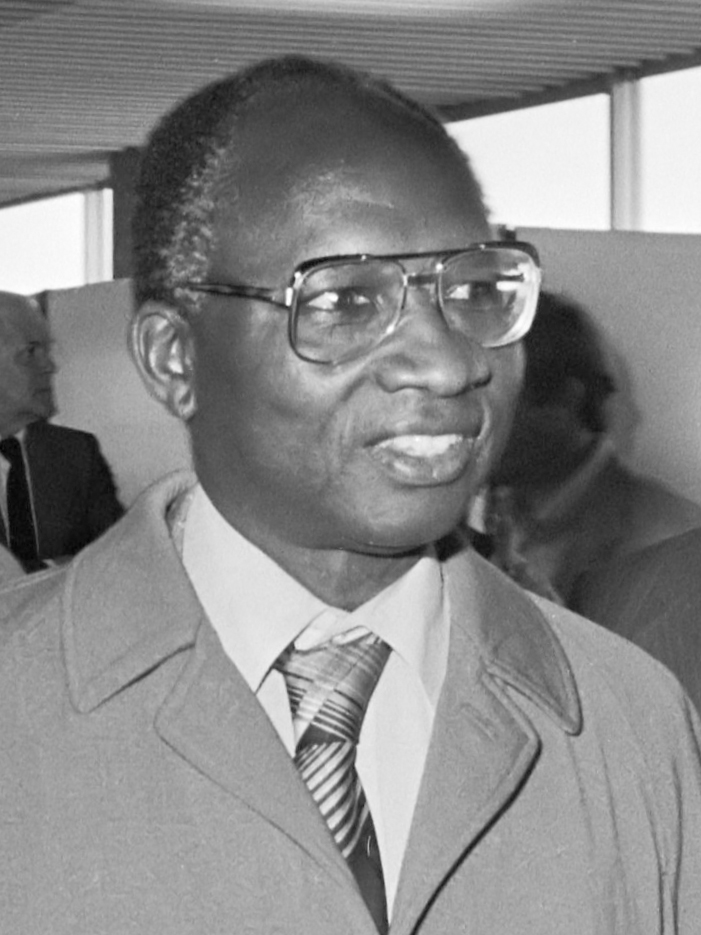

Nominee	Dawda Jawara	Sheriff Dibba	Assan Musa Camara
Party	PPP	NCP	GPP
Popular vote	123,385	57,343	27,751
Percentage	59.18%	27.51%	13.31%
- Results by region
President before election
Dawda Jawara
PPP
Elected President
Dawda Jawara
PPP

General elections were held in the Gambia on 11 March 1987. The election date had been announced on 1 January 1987 and nominations for presidential candidates closed on 9 February.

A total of 113 candidates ran for the 36 elected seats in parliament. Both the presidential and parliamentary elections were won by the People's Progressive Party, whose leader Dawda Jawara remained president.

The elections were described as competitive.

== Results ==
=== President ===
Candidate	Party	Votes	%
Dawda Jawara	People's Progressive Party	123,385	59.18
Sheriff Mustapha Dibba	National Convention Party	57,343	27.51
Assan Musa Camara	Gambian People's Party	27,751	13.31
Total		208,479	100.00
Registered voters/turnout		262,593	–
Source: Hughes & Perfect

=== Parliament ===
Party	Votes	%	Seats	+/–
People's Progressive Party	119,248	56.35	31	+4
National Convention Party	55,251	26.11	4	–
Gambian People's Party	31,604	14.93	0	New
United Party–National Convention Party	3,210	1.52	1	–
People's Democratic Organisation for Independence and Socialism	2,069	0.98	0	New
Independents	233	0.11	0	0
Presidential appointees			8	0
Paramount chiefs' representatives			5	0
Attorney General			1	0
Total	211,615	100.00	50	+1
Registered voters/turnout	262,593	–		
Source: Hughes & Perfect
