= Fatoumata Jahumpa Ceesay =

Former speaker of the house of Gambia

Speaker of the House

Gambia Ambassador to South Africa
- In office 2007–2009
- President: Yahya Jammeh
- Preceded by: Belinda Bidwell
- Succeeded by: Elizabeth Renner

Personal details
- Citizenship: Gambia
- Education: Chartered Institute Of Management And Leadership (Certificate)
- Alma mater: Gambia High School

Fatoumatta Jahumpa Ceesay (born 25 October 1957) is a Gambian politician, diplomat, and journalist.. She served as the Speaker of the National Assembly of The Gambia from 2007 to 2009 and has held various significant roles in both national and international institutions. She currently serves as the Gambia's Ambassador to South Africa and is the General Secretary of the Alliance for Patriotic Reorientation and Construction (APRC).

== Early life and education ==
Born in Banjul, the Gambia, Jahumpa Ceesay is the daughter of Garba Jahumpa, the first indigenous mayor of Banjul. She attended Methodist Preparatory and Kindergarten School, Crab Island Junior Secondary School, Armitage High School, and completed her secondary education at Gambia High School in 1977. She obtained a Higher Diploma Certificate in Print Journalism from the Centre for Foreign Journalists in Reston, Virginia, USA in 1995. She has also undergone various local and international training courses, earning certificates in print and broadcasting journalism, human rights, and public relations. In a LinkedIn post, Ceesay stated that she received a certificate from the Chartered Institute of Management and Leadership in Kentucky. She was also nominated amongst scores of prominent Africans who served as a monitor and observer in the Botswana presidential elections on October 24, 2014.

== Career ==
=== Journalism and early public service ===
Jahumpa Ceesay began her media career as an announcer for Radio Gambia. She later worked at Gambia Airways Limited, where she served as Cargo Supervisor and Public Relations Manager by April 1993. She also wrote freelance columns for the Daily Observer and The Point, discussing issues related to women, children, and politics.

Her public affairs career began when she was appointed as a councillor on the Banjul City Council in 1985, and by 1989 she became the first female Deputy Mayor of Banjul. In 1997, President Yahya Jammeh appointed her Director of Press and Public Relations at the Office of the President, and she held that position until January 2002.

=== Parliamentary and diplomatic roles ===
In January 2007, she was nominated to join the National Assembly of the Gambia. The following month, she was nominated to the ECOWAS Parliament, where she assumed the role of Coordinator for the Economic Community Female Parliamentarians Association (ECOFEPA) and became the first woman appointed as the 4th Deputy Speaker. Later in 2007, President Jammeh appointed her Speaker of the National Assembly, a position she held until 2009.

== Political leadership ==
Jahumpa Ceesay founding member of the APRC since its inception in 1996. She was appointed as the party's General Secretary in May 2022, becoming the first woman to hold this position.

== Philanthropy and advocacy ==
Jahumpa Ceesay is the founder of the Family Rights Advancement and Protection (FRAI) organization. An organization that focus on the rights and welfare of families. In April 2021, she donated a drilling machine worth D125,000 to the women of Farato Bojang Kunda to assist in their domestic work.

== Awards and recognition ==
- Insignia of the Medal of the National Order of the Republic of the Gambia (2000).
- Paul Harris Fellowship Award, sponsored by the President of the Gambia.
- Child Friendly Award by the Observer Youth Column.
- Better Life Programme for African Rural Women Award (2005).
- African Women Leaders Diamond Award (2005).
- WAWA Award by ECOWAS (2006).
- Voice Heroine of the Year by The Voice News Magazine (2019).
- Nominated for Most Gender Focused Head of Mission by LWA Men Champions and Future is Female (2023).
