= Gambian People's Party =

Political party in the Gambia

The Gambian People's Party (GPP) was a political party in the Gambia. It was founded by Assan Musa Camara in February 1986 and formally launched on 29 March 1986. GPP was a splinter group of the governing People's Progressive Party. The party got 15.5% of the votes in the 1987 parliamentary elections and 7.96% in the 1992 elections, but it never won a parliamentary seat. Camara contested as the presidential candidate of the party in 1987, and got 29,428 votes (14%). In the 1992 presidential election, he got 8% of the votes.

The party was banned after the 1994 military coup, and its leading members barred from participating in politics.
