= Gambia cough syrup scandal =

Deaths from contaminated medicine in The Gambia

- Date: October 2022
- Location: The Gambia
- Type: Scandal
- Participants: Maiden Pharmaceuticals
- Outcome: Ongoing investigation
- Deaths: 70 children

The Gambia cough syrup scandal refers to the deaths of 70 children in The Gambia from the consumption of four cough syrups manufactured in India. In October 2022, the World Health Organization issued a medical product alert asking regulators to remove Maiden Pharmaceuticals' products from the market. The four products were Promethazine Oral Solution, Kofexmalin Baby Cough Syrup, Makoff Baby Cough Syrup, and Magrip N Cold Syrup.

Indian authorities started investigating an April 2023 allegation that a pharmaceutical regulator in Haryana state, who holds a senior position in the state health department, accepted a bribe and switched samples of contaminated cough syrup before the state government laboratory tested them. Maiden Pharmaceuticals produced the cough syrup in question, and it has been implicated in child deaths in Gambia. The bribery allegation indicates that Maiden Pharmaceuticals had foreknowledge that their cough syrup was tainted. Tests conducted by two independent laboratories on behalf of the WHO confirmed the presence of lethal toxins—ethylene glycol and diethylene glycol in the syrup. Indian authorities, however, did not find any toxins but did identify labeling issues with Maiden Pharmaceuticals' cough syrup. Naresh Kumar Goyal, the founder of Maiden Pharmaceuticals, previously denied any wrongdoing in the syrup production.

Gambian families have decided to sue Indian manufacturers after the cough syrup deaths, which is a result of toxic contamination.
