= Sadibou Hydara =

Gambian military and political leader (1964-1995)

Minister of the Interior, The Gambia
- In office July 1994 – 27 January 1995
- President: Yahya Jammeh

Spokesman of the Armed Forces Provisional Ruling Council
- In office 1994–1995

Personal details
- Born: 1 April 1964 Dippa Kunda, Serekunda, The Gambia
- Died: 3 June 1995 (aged 31) Mile 2 Prison, Banjul, The Gambia
- Occupation: Military officer, politician

Military service
- Allegiance: The Gambia
- Branch/service: Gambia National Army
- Rank: Captain

Sadibou Hydara (1 April 1964, Serekunda—6 June 1995, Banjul) was a Gambian military leader and politician. He was a key figure in the 1994 coup d'état that overthrew the government of President Dawda Jawara. Hydara was a founding member of the Armed Forces Provisional Ruling Council (AFPRC) and briefly served as the Minister of the Interior before his arrest and death in custody in 1995.

== Biography ==
Sadibou Hydara was born in April 1964 in Dippa Kunda, Serekunda. He spent much of his childhood in Sierra Leone where his father was a trader. He attended the all-boys Ansarul Islamic Boys Secondary School in Koidutown. After he completed his secondary school education, Hydara returned to the Gambia, where he attended The Gambia College in Brikama. He then joined the Gambia National Gendarmerie and studied at military colleges and academies around the world, including in the United States, Turkey, France, Cuba, and United Kingdom. He served in various United Nations and ECOWAS peacekeeping operations and was a member of ECOMOG, the first Gambia contingent of the ECOWAS peacekeeping mission in Liberia. Hydara played a central role in the successful military coup d'état that brought Yahya Jammeh to power in 1994. He was appointed Minister of the Interior and spokesman of the Armed Forces Provisional Ruling Council (AFPRC).

On 27 January 1995, less than a year later, Hydara was arrested for allegedly conspiring to overthrow AFPRC leader Yahya Jammeh. He was detained at Mile 2 Prison and subjected to severe torture while in detention. On 3 June 1995, before standing trial, he died in custody. Official reports cited natural causes, but his family disputed this, stating he had no known health issues.

Hydara spoke English, French, Arabic, Wolof, and his native Mandinka.
