= Assan Musa Camara =

Gambian politician (1923–2013)

2nd vice president of the Gambia
- Tenure: 15 September 1972 – May 1977
- President: Dawda Jawara
- Predecessor: Sheriff Mustapha
- Successor: Alieu Badara Njie

4th vice president of the Gambia
- Tenure: 1981 – May 1982
- Predecessor: Alieu Badara Njie
- Successor: Bakary Bunja Darbo
- Born: 21 April 1923
- Died: September 15, 2013 (aged 90)

Assan Musa Camara (also known as Andrew David Camara; 21 April 1923 – 15 September 2013) was a Gambian politician. He served as Vice President of the Gambia under president Dawda Jawara, almost continuously from 1972 to 1977, and then again from 1981 to 1982, and as a member of parliament (MP) for Kantora from 1960 to 1987. He founded the Gambian People's Party and contested the Gambia's presidential elections of 1987 and 1992 against then incumbent president Dawda Jawara.

== Early life and education ==
The son of a Fula farmer and cattle breeder, Camara was born in Mansajang Kunda near Basse Santa Su in April 1923. He was an Anglican convert, taking the name Andrew David. He was first educated in Mansajang Anglican Mission School, and then at St. Mary's Primary School in Bathurst (now Banjul) from 1937 to 1940. He was asked to join the team set up by Bishop John Daly to find a suitable location in British Gambia for an Anglican mission station, which led to the establishment of the Anglican Mission School at Kristi Kunda in the Upper River Region. He also studied at Kristikunda Mission School where he obtained his Cambridge School Certificate and later at Georgetown College in M.I.D where he graduated with a qualified teacher's certificate.

== Teaching career ==
He began working as a teacher in Kristi Kunda in January 1949, and became its head teacher afterwards. He resigned from his post in 1959 to enter politics. He stood successfully as an independent candidate with the support from the Gambian Democratic Party in Kantoura constituency in the 1960 House of Representatives election.

== Political career ==
Camara was later appointed by Governor Sir Edward Henry Windley to the executive council as a minister without portfolio and held that position until 1961, when he was appointed minister of education after the appointment of Pierre Sarr N'Jie as chief minister. He joined the United Party (UP) and successfully defended his seat for Kantoura constituency as a UP candidate in the 1962 election.

In 1963, he switched to the People's Progressive Party (PPP). He was appointed minister of education, labour and social welfare in November 1963. He was later appointed the minister of external affairs in January 1968 until 1974, the period which saw Gambia develop close ties with Guinea and Cape Verde during his time in office.

In September 1972, he was appointed vice president following the dismissal and resignation of Sheriff Mustapha Dibba. While he was still vice president, he became minister of local government and lands. A few months later, he converted to Islam and adopted the name Assam Musa. After the 1977 election, he was appointed minister of finance and trade and was replaced by Alieu Badara Njie as vice president. He also served briefly as minister of education. In August 1978, he once again became vice president when Njie resigned.

== 1981 Coup attempt and aftermath ==
During the failed 1981 coup attempt, as a senior minister in Banjul, he played an important role in resisting the coup attempt and actions helped persuade the Senegalese government to intervene to restore President Jawara.

He came under the president's suspicion of backing independent candidates in the Upper River Division in the 1982 general election. After the election, he lost the vice presidency and dropped out from the cabinet. He resigned from the PPP on 4 February 1986. Later that same month, he formed the Gambia People's Party (GPP), along with two former ministers.

After the 1994 coup, the GPP was banned and he himself was barred from standing in the parliament. In December 2002, the United Democratic Party (UDP) was reported to appoint Camara as its national chairman but Camara himself turned it down. In January 2005, he supported the National Alliance for Democracy and Development (NADD), which he was chosen as its chairman. Tensions within the NADD led to his resignation on 7 March 2006, and he retired from politics soon after.

He died in Banjul on 15 September 2013, aged 90, after a long illness and was buried in Old Jeshwang Cemetery, Kanifang.
