= Sidia Jatta =

Gambian politician (born 1945)

Chairperson of the People's Democratic Organisation for Independence and Socialism
- Incumbent
- Assumed office 1986
- Deputy: Halifa Sallah

Personal details
- Born: Sidia Sana Jatta; 1945 (age 80–81) Sutukoba, Gambia Colony and Protectorate
- Party: PDOIS
- Other political affiliations: Coalition 2016
- Education: University of Grenoble

Sidia Sana Jatta (born 1945) is a Gambian politician, academic, and writer.

== Early life and education ==
A Mandinka, Jatta was born in Sutukoba, Wuli District. He was educated locally and at Nungua Secondary School, near Accra, Ghana from 1961 to 1963, before returning to The Gambia to attend Yundum College from 1964 to 1966. After working as a school teacher in various primary and secondary schools until 1972, he enrolled at the University of Grenoble from 1973 to 1978, obtaining undergraduate and master's degrees in linguistics. He returned to France again to further his study in 1983.

== Career ==
After returning to The Gambia, Jatta worked for the Curriculum Development Centre from 1978 to 1983, later as senior curriculum development officer, and was also a research fellow at the International African Institute, London from 1980 to 1982. He resigned from the government in 1986 in protest of the performance of the ruling People's Progressive Party government.

Jatta founded the People's Democratic Organisation for Independence and Socialism (PDOIS) in 1986, an opposition party to ruling president Sir Dawda Jawara and was elected its first chairperson in 1987. He is the coeditor of the party's newspaper, Foroyaa. He stood in Wuli Constituency for the PDOIS in the 1987 House of Representatives election stood and again in 1992 but finished last in both elections. Along with Halifa Sallah, he refused the offer of a post in the Armed Forces Provisional Ruling Council government in 1994. He was briefly detained in August 1994 in defiance of the government's ban on political activities.

In 1997, Wuli Constituency was divided into two constituencies (Wuli East and Wuli West) and he won Wuli West Constituency in the 1997 National Assembly election. Subsequently, he became one of the most trenchant critics in the APRC government in the country's National Assembly. He was defeated in the 2022 Gambian parliamentary election.

Jatta is also the Secretary General of Wulli Adult Literacy Development Association.
