= Badara Joof =

Gambian politician (died 2023)

11th Vice-President of the Gambia
- In office 4 May 2022 – 18 January 2023
- President: Adama Barrow
- Preceded by: Isatou Touray
- Succeeded by: Muhammad B. S. Jallow

Minister of Education
- In office 22 February 2017 – 4 May 2022
- President: Adama Barrow

Personal details
- Born: Badara Alieu Joof; 1957 or 1958
- Died: 18 January 2023 (aged 65) India
- Party: Independent
- Education: University of Bristol; University of London; University of Bath

Badara Alieu Joof (1957/1958 – 18 January 2023) was a Gambian politician and civil servant who served as Vice President of The Gambia from 2022 until his death in 2023. He previously served as Minister of Higher Education, Research, Science and Technology from 2017 to 2022.

== Early life and education ==
Joof was a student at Armitage High School and trained as a teacher himself at Yundum Teachers' College. He held a bachelor of education degree from the University of Bristol, a master's degree in English literature from the University of London, and a master's degree in development economics from the University of Bath.

== Professional career ==
Joof began his career as a qualified teacher, teaching English at The Gambia College. He was then head of the department of languages and literature at Nusrat High School. He was the permanent secretary at the Ministry of Education for many years. In March 2002, it was reported that he had been transferred to the permanent secretary at the Ministry of Local Government and Lands.

Joof worked as the World Bank Liaison Officer to the Gambia. In this role, he assisted higher education minister Mariama Sarr-Ceesay in introducing a new education policy to the Gambia. He also urged the Gambian tourism sector to "move from routine tourism and be more proactive." He had led a World Bank project, Support to NGO Network Tango, which had a budget of $220,000 and lasted from 2010 to 2013, the stated purpose of which was "to enhance the efficiency and accountability of non-Governmental Organizations (NGO's) in delivering basic services to the poor in the member country." In 2013, Joof visited various project sites in the Gambia along with Ministry of Agriculture officials to gain a better understanding of various challenges they faced. In 2014, Joof was appointed an Education Specialist in Dakar, Senegal to the World Bank. The University of the Gambia library at the Faraba Banta Campus was named after him by president Adama Barrow.The development was made during the inauguration of Lot 1 of the University of The Gambia development project at the Faraba Banta Campus.

== Political career ==
In 2017, President Adama Barrow appointed Joof as his Minister of Higher Education, Research, Science and Technology, before promoting him to the Vice Presidency in 2022.
