= Armed Forces Provisional Ruling Council =

Military dictatorship in The Gambia from 1994 to 1996

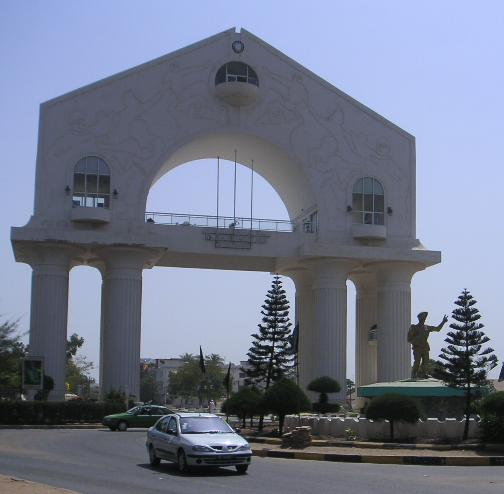
Arch 22 monument, a memorial of the 1994 coup

The Armed Forces Provisional Ruling Council (AFPRC) gained control of Gambia in July 1994, in a military coup d'état. The AFPRC deposed the Dawda Jawara government and banned opposition political activity. Lieutenant Yahya Jammeh, chairman of the AFPRC, became head of state. A few months later, Captain Sadibou Hydara, who was the spokesperson of the AFPRC, and Captain Sabali, deputy leader of the AFPRC, were accused by Jammeh of plotting a coup. Both men were arrested and detained at the maximum prison. Captain Hydara was tortured and killed in prison. It was believed that Captain Hydara who was the most educated among the original members of the AFPRC was in favor of returning the country to civilian rule, and strongly objected to Jammeh's candidacy. Edward Singateh was appointed deputy leader of the junta.

The AFPRC announced a transition plan for return to democratic civilian rule. The Provisional Independent Electoral Commission (PIEC) was established in 1996 to conduct national elections. The transition process included the compilation of a new electoral register; adoption of a new constitution by referendum in August of that year; presidential elections in September of that year and legislative elections in January 1997, respectively. Colonel Jammeh retired from the Army to run for president. Jammeh won the elections and was sworn into office as President of the Gambia on November 6, 1996.

The PIEC was transformed into the Independent Electoral Commission on April 17, 1997; this commission deals with voter registration and the holding of elections and referendums.

== Principal Government Officials ==
- Armed Forces Provisional Ruling Council Chairman--Capt. Yahya A.J.J. Jammeh
- Armed Forces Provisional Ruling Council Vice Chairman--Capt. Edward
- Armed Forces Provisional Ruling Council Vice Chairman--Sanna Sabally
- Minister of the Interior Sadibou Hydara
- Minister of Defence Edward Singati
- Minister of Local Government Yankuba Turay

Deposed in the 1994 coup d'état.
Armed Forces Provisional Ruling Council	July 1994	October 1996	Vice chairmen of the council were Sanna Sabally and Edward Singhateh
