= COVID-19 pandemic in the Gambia =

COVID-19 pandemic in Gambia
- Disease: COVID-19
- Pathogen: SARS-CoV-2
- Location: The Gambia
- First outbreak: Wuhan, China
- Index case: Banjul
- Arrival date: 17 March 2020 (6 years, 5 months and 4 days)
- Confirmed cases: 12,627 (updated 5 Aug 2026)
- Deaths: 372 (updated 5 Aug 2026)
- Vaccinations: Updated 5 Aug 2026: 674,314 (total vaccinated); 539,186 (fully vaccinated); 1,444,492 (doses administered)

The COVID-19 pandemic in The Gambia was a part of the worldwide pandemic of coronavirus disease 2019 (COVID-19) caused by severe acute respiratory syndrome coronavirus 2 (SARS-CoV-2). The virus was confirmed to have reached The Gambia in March 2020.

== Background ==
The largest hospital in the Gambia is Edward Francis Small Teaching Hospital (EFSTH), which is a tertiary referral hospital in the capital city Banjul. In 2012 it was reported that there were three other tertiary hospitals, 38 health centres, and 492 primary health posts. The leading causes of mortality in the country are malaria and tuberculosis. There are two medical schools in the country, at the University of the Gambia and the American International University West Africa, as well as MRC Unit The Gambia, formerly run by the United Kingdom's Medical Research Council, and now run by the London School of Hygiene & Tropical Medicine. Political health leadership is provided by the Minister of Health and Social Care, who is currently Ahmadou Lamin Samateh, the former Chief Medical Director of EFSTH.

=== Disease prevention ===
According to the National Health Sector Strategy Plan 2014–2020, disease control and prevention in The Gambia is the responsibility of Epidemiology and Disease Control (EDC). EDC is the focal point for integrated disease surveillance and response (IDSR). It emphasises notifiable diseases and diseases of epidemic potential.

== Timeline ==
=== WHO response ===
On 31 December 2019, the World Health Organization (WHO) was informed of a cluster of pneumonia cases of an unknown cause in the city of Wuhan, China. This outbreak was declared a Public Health Emergency of International Concern (PHEIC) on 30 January 2020, and in turn was characterised as a pandemic by the WHO from 11 March.

=== March 2020 ===
- The first case of COVID-19 in The Gambia was reported on 17 March and received treatment at MRC Unit The Gambia's specialist clinic in Fajara. The patient was a woman in her thirties who had travelled to The Gambia from the United Kingdom on 15 March, and had gone into self-isolation after feeling feverish. The Ministry of Health said it was in the process of contacting and isolating all the passengers on the flight.
- On 18 March 32 passengers arriving from the United Kingdom were placed under quarantine in a hotel in Banjul. Fourteen of them broke out of the quarantine.
- The first death in The Gambia took place on 23 March. By the end of March there had been 4 confirmed cases, 3 of whom remained active.

=== April to December 2020 ===
- In response to an increase in the rate of infection, the country made wearing face masks compulsory effective from 24 July.
- There were 7 new cases in April, 14 in May, 24 in June, 449 in July, 2465 in August, 616 in September, 93 in October, 70 in November, and 55 in December. The total number of cases stood at 11 in April, 25 in May, 49 in June, 498 in July, 2963 in August, 3579 in September, 3672 in October, 3742 in November, and 3797 in December.
- Eight patients recovered in April. The number of recovered patients increased to 20 in May, 27 in June, 68 in July, 2161 in September, 3196 in October, 3601 in November, and 3664 in December, leaving 2 active cases at the end of April, 4 at the end of May, 20 at the end of June, 421 at the end of July, 1835 at the end of August, 1306 at the end of September, 357 at the end of October, 18 at the end of November, and 9 at the end of December.
- The death toll rose to 2 in June, 9 in July, 96 in August, 112 in September, 119 in October, 123 in November, and 124 in December.

=== January to December 2021 ===
- Gambia's first confirmed case of the B.1.1.7 variant was reported on 14 January.
- Vaccinations started on 12 March.
- There were 293 new cases in January, 622 in February, 747 in March, 428 in April, 103 in May, 89 in June, 1630 in July, 2027 in August, 198 in September, 39 in October, 19 in November, and 178 in December. The total number of cases stood at 4090 in January, 4712 in February, 5459 in March, 5887 in April, 5990 in May, 6079 in June, 7709 in July, 9736 in August, 9934 in September, 9973 in October, 9992 in November, and 10170 in December.
- The number of recovered patients stood at 3792 in January, 4089 in February, 5070 in March, 5341 in April, 5767 in May, 5858 in June, 6602 in July, 9345 in August, 9588 in September, 9618 in October, 9640 in November, and 9700 in December, leaving 171 active cases at the end of January, 473 at the end of February, 224 at the end of March, 372 at the end of April, 45 at the end of May, 40 at the end of June, 895 at the end of July, 68 at the end of August, 8 at the end of September, 14 at the end of October, 10 at the end of November, and 127 at the end of December.
- The death toll rose to 127 in January, 150 in February, 165 in March, 174 in April, 178 in May, 181 in June, 212 in July, 323 in August, 338 in September, 341 in October, 342 in November, and 343 in December.
- Modeling by the WHO’s Regional Office for Africa suggests that due to under-reporting, the true cumulative number of infections by the end of 2021 was around 1.1 million while the true number of COVID-19 deaths was around 1446.

=== 2022 ===
- Samples taken between May and October showed that the rapidly spreading BA.5.2.1.7 variant was present in the Gambia.
- There were 1672 new cases in January, 997 in February, 50 in March, 7 in April, 6 in May, 76 in July, 317 in August, 113 in September, 72 in October, and 6 in November. The total number of cases stood at 11842 in January, 11939 in February, 11989 in March, 11996 in April, 12002 in May, 12078 in July, 12395 in August, 12508 in September, 12580 in October, and 12586 in November.
- The number of recovered patients stood at 11138 in January, 11559 in February, 11621 in March, 11630 in April, 11634 in May, 12174 in October, and 12189 in November, leaving 357 active cases at the end of January, 15 at the end of February, 3 at the end of March, 1 at the end of April, 3 at the end of May, 34 at the end of October, and 25 at the end of November.
- The death toll rose to 347 in January, 365 in February, 371 in August, and 372 in September.

=== 2023 ===
- There were 98 confirmed cases in 2023, bringing the total number of cases to 12,684. The death toll remained unchanged.

== Government measures ==
Overseas travel by public officials was suspended by a circular issued by President Adama Barrow on 13 March. Barrow ordered all universities to close and for all gatherings to cease on 17 March. On 18 March, sessions of the National Assembly and hearings for the Truth, Reconciliation and Reparations Commission were suspended. Also on 18 March 2020, President Adama Barrow closed schools and prohibited gatherings. Flights from 13 countries were suspended on 19 March. Passengers arriving from a further 47 countries would have to undergo a mandatory 14-day quarantine. Football games were cancelled.

The only facility with capacity for COVID-19 testing in the country is MRC Unit The Gambia. According to their website, testing is arranged by appointment only, organised through a Ministry of Health specialist phone number.

== Response ==
The governments of The Gambia and its sole neighbor, Senegal, agreed to close their border for 21 days starting 23 March, with exceptions for "essential services" and transporting food and medicine. The Gambia's airspace was also closed, with exceptions for medical flights and transporting goods. Health minister Ahmadou Lamin Samateh acknowledged that enforcing the border closure was challenging, but said that the closure was important for fighting COVID-19.

On 27 March, President Adama Barrow declared a state of emergency, ordering closure of places of worship and non-essential businesses, prohibiting gatherings of more than 10 people and limiting passengers on public transportation.

On 28 March, the Jack Ma and Alibaba Foundations donated test kits and personal protective equipment to the Gambia to help fight the pandemic.

As of 30 March, business-people were being arrested for price gouging.

== Impact ==
The tourism industry was affected by the pandemic, causing hardship for Gambians who depend on tourism for their incomes. Many restaurants and hotels were closed, with only a few hotels remaining open for tourists stranded by travel restrictions.

== See also ==
- COVID-19 pandemic in Africa
- COVID-19 pandemic by country and territory
