= Muhammad B. S. Jallow =

Vice President of the Gambia

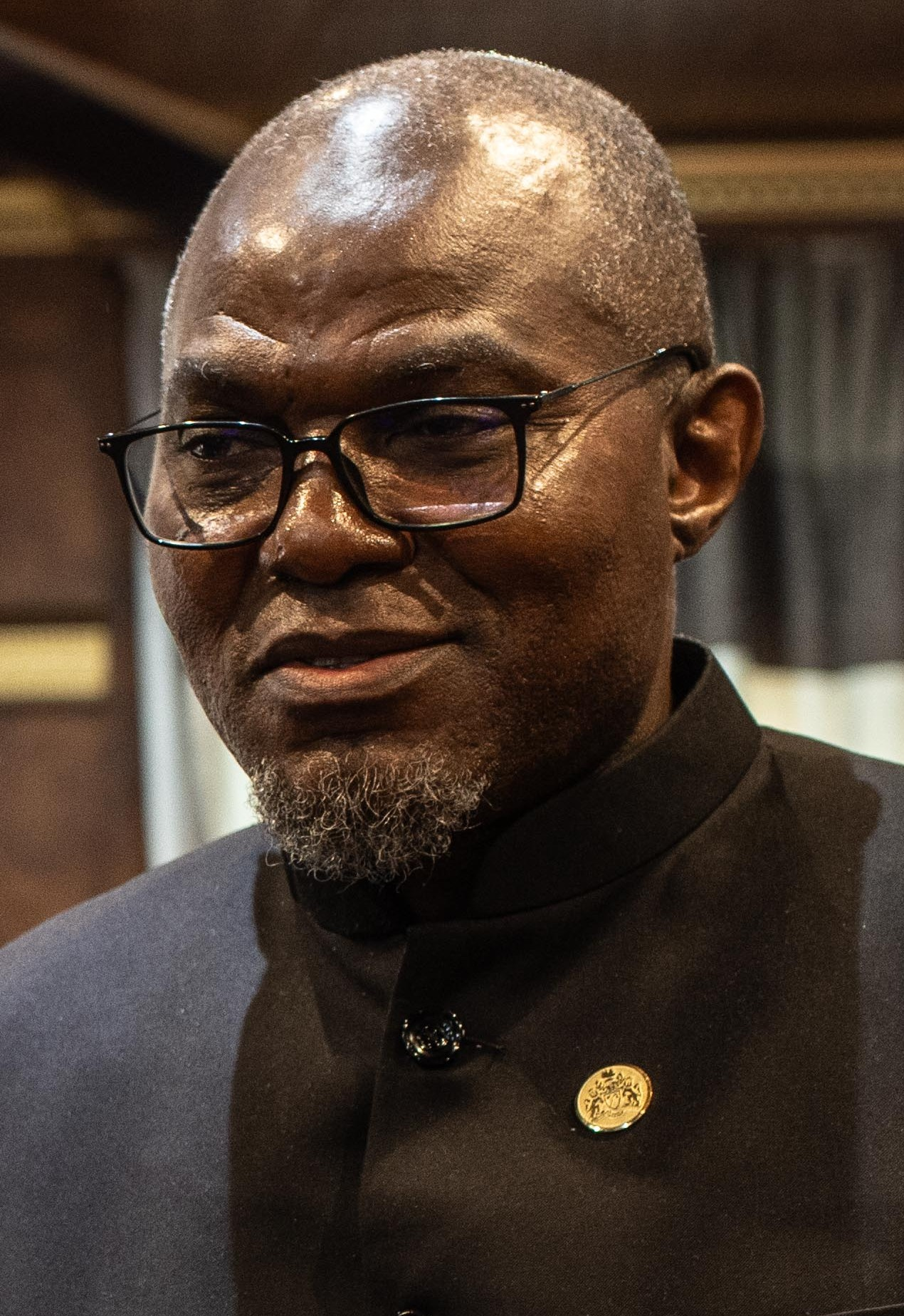
- Jallow in 2023

Vice-President of the Gambia
- Incumbent
- Assumed office 24 February 2023
- President: Adama Barrow
- Preceded by: Badara Joof

Personal details
- Born: 1960 (age 65–66) Banjul, Gambia Colony and Protectorate
- Party: Independent

Muhammad B. S. Jallow (born 1960) is a Fulani Gambian politician and civil servant who has served as the Vice President of the Gambia since 24 February 2023. He was appointed to this position following the death of his predecessor, Badara Joof.

== Early life and education ==
Jallow began his tertiary educational journey at the Gambia College, where he obtained his Primary Teacher’s Certificate (PTC) in 1985 and Higher Teacher's Certificate (HTC) in 1988.

== Civil service career ==
Jallow's career in the Gambian civil service spanned several decades. He started as a teacher and progressively held various administrative roles within the Ministry of Education.

He later served as Permanent Secretary in multiple ministries. In August 2019, President Adama Barrow appointed him as Secretary General and Head of the Civil Service, a position he held until his retirement in May 2020.

== Vice Presidency ==
Following the passing of Vice President Badara Joof in January 2023, President Barrow appointed Jallow as Vice President on 24 February 2023.
