= Yahya Jammeh =

President of the Gambia from 1996 to 2017

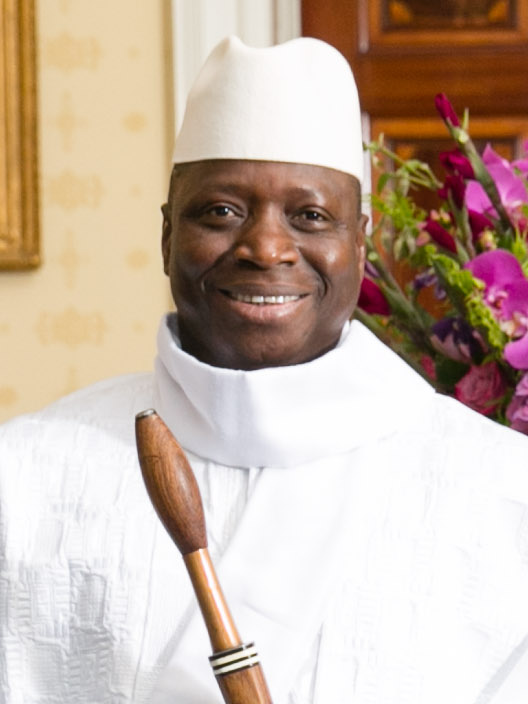
- Jammeh (standing) in 2014

2nd President of the Gambia
- In office 6 November 1996 – 21 January 2017 (Note: Jammeh's term was originally scheduled to end on 19 January 2017. However, in a widely disputed move, parliament extended his presidential term for three months and he refused to relinquish power until 21 January when he was forced to step down after a regional military intervention. Adama Barrow nevertheless took his oath at the Gambian Embassy in Senegal on 19 January, as scheduled, after which much of the international community recognised him as the legitimate President.)
- Vice President: Isatou Njie-Saidy
- Preceded by: Himself (as Chairman of the Armed Forces Provisional Ruling Council); Dawda Jawara (as President, 1994)
- Succeeded by: Adama Barrow

Chairman of the Armed Forces Provisional Ruling Council
- In office 22 July 1994 – 6 November 1996
- Deputy: Sanna B Sabally
- Preceded by: Position established
- Succeeded by: Position abolished Himself (as President)

Personal details
- Born: Yahya Abdul-Aziz Jemus Junku Jammeh; 25 May 1965 (age 61) Kanilai, The Gambia
- Party: APRC
- Spouses: Tuti Faal (m. 1994; div. 1999); Zeinab Soumah (m. 1999); Alima Sallah (m. 2010; div. 2012)
- Children: 2
- Parents: Abdul Aziz James Junkung Jammeh (father); Aja Fatou Ashombi Bojang (mother)

Military service
- Allegiance: The Gambia
- Branch: National Gendarmerie; Gambian National Army
- Service years: 1984–1996
- Rank: Colonel
- Commands: National Gendarmerie
- Criminal information
- Status: Claimed for the charges of Murder of 59 migrants. Forced disappearances, Extrajudicial killings, arbitrary detentions.

Yahya Abdul-Aziz Jemus Junkung Jammeh (born 25 May 1965) is a Gambian politician and former soldier, who served as President of the Gambia from 1996 to 2017. He was the Chairman of the Armed Forces Provisional Ruling Council (AFPRC) from 1994 to 1996.

Jammeh was born in Kanilai, in West Coast Region of the Gambia, and is a Muslim of the Jola ethnic group. He attended Gambia High School in Banjul from 1978 to 1983 and served in the Gambian National Gendarmerie from 1984 to 1989. He was then commissioned as an officer of the Gambian National Army, commanding the Military Police from 1992 to 1994. In July 1994, he came to power by leading a bloodless coup d'état that overthrew the elected government of Sir Dawda Jawara. At first ruling by decree, he was elected president in the 1996 election. Jammeh was re-elected as president in 2001, 2006 and 2011, but lost to Adama Barrow in 2016.

His presidency oversaw a shift towards authoritarianism, demonstrated in particular by his policies towards anti-government journalists, LGBT+ people and opposition parties. His foreign policy led to constant difficulties with the country's sole neighbour, Senegal. In 2013, Jammeh withdrew the Gambia from the Commonwealth of Nations and in 2016 he began the process of withdrawing the country from the International Criminal Court, one year after he declared the nation an Islamic republic. All three decisions were later rescinded by his successor's government, despite Jammeh's supporters arguing that his foreign policy encouraged self-sufficiency and anti-colonialism.

Jammeh has been implicated in serious human rights violations, such as murder, rape and torture, as highlighted in the final report of the Truth, Reconciliation and Reparations Commission. He is now living in exile in Equatorial Guinea. His assets around the world have been frozen by many countries amidst additional accusations of embezzling millions of state fund to fund a life of luxury. Jammeh has denied the allegations against him and has not been formally charged.

== Early life and military service ==
Jammeh was born on 25 May 1965 in Kanilai, a village in the Foni Kansala district of the Western Division of the Gambia. He is the son of Aja Fatou Ashombi Bojang, a housewife and trader, and Abdul Aziz James Junkung Jammeh, a career wrestler. Jammeh's grandparents migrated to the Gambia from the Casamance region of Senegal. He had a rural upbringing as part of a Muslim Jola family, primarily focused in Kanilai. One of his closest childhood friends was reportedly Mustapha James Kujabi. He attended Kanilai primary school, Saint Edwards primary school in Bwiam, from 1972 to 1978. After passing the common entrance (CE) exam, he was awarded a government scholarship to Gambia High School in Banjul, in 1978. His formal education ended after he was successful in his O Levels in 1983.

In those days, he used to defend the rights of many Gendarmes who for one reason or another had felt apart with the Gendarmerie command and administration and were brought to the [Military Police] for either investigation or punishment. What actually makes him changed into the biggest violator of the human and civic rights of ordinary Gambian citizens is beyond my comprehension.

— Capt. Bunja Darboe (rtd)

In April 1984, Jammeh joined what was then the Gambian National Gendarmerie as a private. He was part of the Special Intervention Unit from 1984 to 1986 and was an escort training instructor at the Gendarmerie Training School from 1986 to 1989. He was promoted to sergeant in April 1986, and to cadet officer in December 1987. A former Gendarmerie officer, Binneh S. Minteh, later claimed that Jammeh "had always singled out Mandinkas as bad people" during his time as a Gendarme. In particular, Minteh recalled Jammeh's "ruthless and disrespectful encounter" with sergeant major Kebba Dibba, and when he "brandished a pistol and threatened to shoot" a captain named Ebrima Camara simply on the basis of his ethnicity.

He joined the Gambian National Army and was commissioned as a second lieutenant on 29 September 1989, serving as the officer in charge (OIC) of the Presidential Escort, part of the Presidential Guards, from 1989 to 1990. In 1991, he served as the officer commanding (OC) the Mobile Gendarmerie, and from 1992 to 1994 was the OC of the Gambia National Army Military Police. On 1 February 1992, he had been promoted to lieutenant. Jammeh was the head of security detail attached to Pope John Paul II during his visit to the Gambia in February 1992. He attended the Military Police Officers Basic Course (MPOBC) at Fort McClellan in the United States from September 1993 to January 1994.

== 1994 coup d'état and military rule ==
=== 1994 coup d'état ===
Jammeh was one of the four junior Army officers who organised the 1994 coup d'état against Sir Dawda Jawara's government. The other three were Sana Sabally, Sadibou Hydara and Edward Singateh. The coup, which took place on 22 July 1994, was successful and bloodless, leading to Jawara fleeing into exile. Four days later, on 26 July, the Armed Forces Provisional Ruling Council (AFPRC) was formed with Jammeh as its chairman. Jammeh promised that it would be a "coup with a difference", and that the country would be returned to civilian rule "as soon as we have set things right". One result of the coup was that the European Union and the United States, the major donors of foreign aid to the Gambia, suspended their aid programmes until the country was returned to civil rule. Jammeh claimed the suspension of aid programmes amounted to "neocolonialism". A Western diplomat who spoke to The New York Times said, "This is exactly the same phenomenon we have seen elsewhere, with the only difference being that so far there has been no violence." In particular, the coup was compared with Samuel Doe's in Liberia, which led to the First Liberian Civil War.

The 1994 coup d'état in the Gambia, overthrowing Jawara's government, represented a reversal in the general trend in sub-Saharan Africa after 1989 away from authoritarianism and towards multiparty politics. The Gambia had previously represented an anomaly in Africa as one of the few countries that had a functioning democracy prior to 1989.

=== Rule through the AFPRC ===
In the aftermath of the coup, Jammeh governed by decree alongside four other junior officers and several civilians. He banned all political activity, arrested two socialist journalists, and detained several of his Army superiors. He also confined ministers of Jawara's government under house arrest. On 17 October, Jammeh announced that there would be a four-year transition to civilian government. In November 1994, the same month when Jammeh was formally promoted to the rank of captain, there was an unsuccessful coup attempt by several disaffected young officers leading to numerous deaths, but Jammeh remained in power. The National Consultative Committee (NCC) was appointed on 7 December to review the transition process, and when they reported on 27 January 1995, they recommended a two-year transition period. The same day as the NCC's report, two of the original coup leaders, Sabally and Hydara, launched an unsuccessful attempt to overthrow Jammeh as chairman. Subsequently, Edward Singateh was appointed as vice-chairman of the AFPRC, and Hydara died in prison on 3 June.

The Constitutional Review Commission (CRC) was appointed in April 1995 and reported to the government in November 1995. Its report was published in March 1996 was put to a national referendum on 8 August 1996. The new constitution, which provided for multiparty elections, an unlimited number of five-year presidential terms, and a lowering of the voting age from 21 to 18, was approved by a majority of 70%. According to Gambian American author Abdoulaye Saine, Jammeh would "[enjoy] unrivalled political and economic power as a consequence of the new constitution. In contrast, opposition political parties [would be] sidelined and allowed little political space in a one-sided electoral contest in which Jammeh was the assured ‘winner’." Decree no. 89, issued on 14 August, reiterated the ban on the PPP, the NCP and the GPP, but lifted the ban on the PDOIS and the PDP. In 1996, on 28 August, Jammeh was formally promoted to the rank of colonel and then retired from the army on 6 September, one month before the 1996 presidential election.

== President of the Gambia ==
=== 1996 and 1997 elections ===
Jammeh won the 1996 presidential election as the APRC candidate, winning 56% of the vote and beating Ousainou Darboe, Hamat Bah and Sidia Jatta. Darboe was forced to seek refuge in the Senegalese embassy in Banjul, fearing an assassination plot. In the 1997 parliamentary election, the first to the new National Assembly put in place by the 1996 constitution, the APRC won a majority of seats. However, these two elections, the first following the transition from military to civil rule, were "marred by provisions of the new, doctored constitution, an electoral commission appointed by Jammeh alone in 1995 and a political network that included the Green Boys – a now-disbanded vigilante group that was mobilised to intimidate the electorate to ensure Jammeh’s ‘victory’." Saine argues that this combination of intimidation and harassment of the opposition, an inherent bias provided by the 1996 constitution, as well as a distinct financial advantage, meant that "the presidential and national assembly elections were lost long before the first ballot was cast."

=== Elections ===
Jammeh founded the Alliance for Patriotic Reorientation and Construction as his political party. He was elected as president in September 1996. Foreign observers did not deem these elections free and fair. He was re-elected on 18 October 2001 with about 53% of the vote; this election was generally deemed free and fair by observers, despite some very serious shortcomings ranging from overt government intimidation of voters to technical innovations (such as raising the required deposit to stand for election by a factor of 25) to distort the process in favour of the incumbent regime.

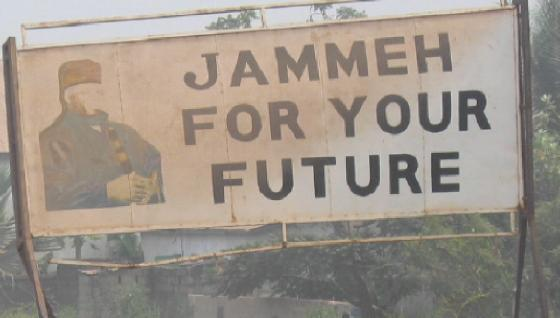
Jammeh electoral poster in 2005

A coup attempt against Jammeh was reported to have been thwarted on 21 March 2006; Jammeh, who was in Mauritania at the time, quickly returned home. Army chief of staff Col. Ndure Cham, the alleged leader of the plot, reportedly fled to neighbouring Senegal, while other alleged conspirators were arrested and were put on trial for treason. In April 2007, ten former officers accused of involvement were convicted and given prison sentences; four of them were sentenced to life in prison.

Jammeh ran for a third term in the presidential election held on 22 September 2006; the election was initially planned for October but was moved forward because of the Muslim holy month of Ramadan. He was re-elected with 67.3% of the vote and was declared the winner of the election; the opposition candidate Ousainou Darboe finished second, as in 2001.

In November 2011, Jammeh was again re-elected as president for a fourth term in office, reportedly having received 72% of the popular vote.

=== Domestic policy ===
==== Suppression of the press ====
One of Jammeh's consistent targets throughout his time as President was the press and the media, as a whole as well as individual journalists. In 1998, the independent Citizen FM radio station was forced to close after a number of its staff were arrested and its equipment was confiscated. After its American proprietor sold it to a businessman with close ties to Jammeh in 1999, The Daily Observer became notably pro-Jammeh. In August 2000, the anti-government Radio 1 FM suffered an arson attack. Abdoulaye Saine states that Jammeh was able to use Gambia Radio & Television Service as his personal propaganda outlet whenever he required.

Jammeh had made a number of public statements against the press. In July 2000, he said that "anybody bent on disturbing the peace and stability of the nation [should] be buried six feet deep." In April 2004, Jammeh told journalists to obey his government "or go to hell". In June 2005, he said that he had allowed "too much freedom of expression" in the Gambia.

In response to his suppression of the press and media in the Gambia, various online newspapers and radio stations were established by self-exiled Gambian journalists to publicise alleged government atrocities. These include Freedom Newspaper, The Gambia Echo and Gainako.

Jammeh also saw through legislation to restrict the activities of the press. The Newspaper Act 1994 imposed criminal penalties on private publications that failed to pay a yearly registration fee. The National Media Communication Act 2000 forced journalists to reveal confidential sources to police and the judiciary on demand. In December 2004, the Criminal Code (Amendment) Bill 2004 allowed prison terms for defamation and sedition. The same month, the Newspaper (Amendment) Bill 2004 required newspaper proprietors to purchase expensive operating licenses and forcing them to register their homes as security.

A number of individual journalists were also targeted. In December 2004, Deyda Hydara, then editor of The Point, announced his intention to publicly challenge newly-introduced legislation restricting press freedoms. He was shot and killed when driving home in Banjul on 16 December, leading to thousands protesting on the streets. Some pointed at the government, led by Jammeh, as the murderers, but it has remained unsolved. Furthermore, in July 2006, Ebrima Manneh of The Daily Observer was arrested by state security after attempting to publish a BBC report critical of Jammeh. His arrest was witnessed by his coworkers, and, despite being ordered to release Manneh by an ECOWAS court, the government denied that Manneh was still imprisoned. An unnamed police source said that he believed Manneh "is no longer alive". Both Amnesty International and the Committee to Protect Journalists have called for his release.

==== Women's rights ====
In 1999, Jammeh called those who campaigned against female genital mutilation (FGM) "enemies of Islam". In December 2015, Jammeh banned FGM in the Gambia, labelling the practice as having "no place in Islam or in modern society"; anyone that ignored the ban would face a prison sentence of up to three years. After the end of Ramadan and Eid ul-Fitr in July 2016, Jammeh further announced a ban on child marriages. In 2016, some 30% of women were married while under the age of 18. Yahya Jammeh's response was that anyone caught marrying a girl under 18 years of age would be jailed for up to twenty years.

==== Judiciary ====
As President, Jammeh had significant influence over the judiciary in the Gambia, particularly because Section 98 of the 1996 constitution permits the President to appoint judges directly. Saine argues that Jammeh's employment of judges mainly from other Commonwealth countries allowed him to effectively issue tough sentences to reduce dissent and to imprison both real and perceived threats to the president's power.

==== LGBT rights ====
On 15 May 2008, Jammeh announced that his government would introduce legislation that would set laws against homosexuals that would be "stricter than those in Iran", and that he would "cut off the head" of any gay or lesbian person discovered in the country. News reports indicated his government intended to execute all homosexuals in the country. In a speech given in Tallinding, Jammeh gave a "final ultimatum" to any gays or lesbians in the Gambia, warning them to leave the country. In a speech to the United Nations on 27 September 2013, Jammeh said "[h]omosexuality in all its forms and manifestations which, though very evil, antihuman as well as anti-Allah, is being promoted as a human right by some powers," who "want to put an end to human existence." On 18 February 2014, Jammeh called homosexuals "vermins" by saying that: "We will fight these vermins [sic] called 'homosexuals' or 'gays' the same way we are fighting malaria-causing mosquitoes, if not more aggressively." He also went on to disparage the LGBT acronym by saying that "As far as I am concerned, LGBT can only stand for Leprosy, Gonorrhoea, Bacteria and Tuberculosis, all of which are detrimental to human existence".

In May 2015, in defiance of Western criticism, Jammeh intensified his anti-gay rhetoric, telling a crowd during an agricultural tour: "If you do it [in the Gambia] I will slit your throat – if you are a man and want to marry another man in this country and we catch you, no one will ever set eyes on you again, and no white person can do anything about it."

This prompted a fresh round of condemnation from international human rights leaders. US National Security Advisor Susan Rice released a statement of condemnation on 16 May 2015: "We condemn his comments, and note these threats come amid an alarming deterioration of the broader human rights situation in the Gambia", said Rice. "We are deeply concerned about credible reports of torture, suspicious disappearances – including of two American citizens – and arbitrary detention at the government's hands".

==== HIV/AIDS policy ====
In January 2007, Jammeh claimed he could cure HIV/AIDS and asthma with natural herbs. His claimed treatment program includes instructing patients to cease taking their anti-retroviral drugs. His claims have been criticised for promoting unscientific treatment that could have dangerous results, including the infection of others by those who thought they had been cured by the method. In December 2011, he restated during an interview that the alleged cure for HIV/AIDS was "going very well".

Fadzai Gwaradzimba, a representative of the United Nations Development Programme in the Gambia, was told to leave the country after she expressed doubts about the claims and said the remedy might encourage risky behaviour. In August 2007, Jammeh claimed to have developed a single dose herbal infusion that could treat high blood pressure. Jammeh has also claimed to develop a treatment for infertility in women as part of what is called the President's Alternative Treatment Program (PATP).

=== Foreign policy ===
==== Senegal ====
August and October 2005 saw a border feud with Senegal over increased ferry prices for crossings over the Gambia River. Jammeh has a close relationship with Jolas in the Casamance region of Senegal, who allowed him to "rule with impunity". In turn, Jammeh supported the rebels in the Casamance conflict, by engaging in the trade of illegal drugs, small arms, and also money-laundering with the rebel groups.

==== Mediation and peacekeeping role ====
Shortly after the outbreak of the Guinea-Bissau Civil War in June 1998, Jammeh sought a peaceful resolution to the conflict. He personally canvassed regional opinion on the war in Cape Verde, Mauritania, Guinea and Senegal. He also sent Momodou Lamin Sedat Jobe, his foreign minister, to meet with rebel leader Ansumane Mané to attempt to arrange peace talks in Banjul, though these efforts were fruitless.

According to The Daily Observer, on 10 December 2012, Jammeh secured the release of Senegalese soldiers who had been held as hostages by rebels. He sent a delegation to meet with Senegalese president Macky Sall in early December 2012. The delegation's goal was to discuss a resolution to the ongoing civil unrest in Senegal's southern region of Casamance. Members of the delegation included the Minister of Presidential Affairs, the US ambassador to the Gambia, and members from the Red Cross and Red Crescent.

The Jammeh Foundation for Peace (JFP) was created by Jammeh to help eradicate poverty among Gambians, improve agricultural production, and sponsor educational opportunities for needy students. The foundation has a hospital that is sponsored by the president and provides medical services to the general public.

Donations in 2012 included $2,563,138 to the National Youths Conference and Festival, and "two truckloads of turkey" to the Gambia Christian Council for delivery to the Christian community. Jammeh also bankrolled university education for the less privileged both in the Gambia and abroad.

==== Taiwan ====
Taiwan was once the "financial lifeline" for Jammeh's regime, providing financial support as part of its campaign for international recognition at the United Nations. Taiwanese president Ma Ying-jeou visited the Gambia during Jammeh's presidency. However, Jammeh later cut ties with Taiwan.

=== Economic policy ===
During his leadership over the Republic of The Gambia, he advocated for a liberal market economy, rather than a mixed economy.

=== Human rights abuses ===
==== 2000 shooting of students ====
On 10 and 11 April 2000, the government was accused of the killing of 14 students and a journalist during a student demonstration to protest the death of a student in the Gambia. Jammeh was accused of ordering the shooting of the students, but the government denied the allegations. A government commission of inquiry reportedly concluded that the Police Intervention Unit (PIU) officers were "largely responsible" for many of the deaths and other injuries. The commission also said that five soldiers of the 2nd Infantry Battalion were responsible for the deaths of two students at Brikama. The government stated that the report implicated several PIU officers in the students' deaths and injuries, but those responsible were not prosecuted.

==== 2005 killing of West African migrants ====
Testimony to the Gambia's Truth, Reconciliation and Reparations Commission (TRRC) between 2019 and 2021 implicated Gambian military officials and the Junglers, a paramilitary unit commanded by Jammeh, in the 2005 killings of 50–60 West African migrants, mostly Ghanians, destined for Europe. This corroborates 2018 findings by Human Rights Watch and TRIAL International on the same incident, but contradicts an unpublished UN/ECOWAS report that attributed the killings to rogue security personnel.

According to defence and National Intelligence Agency officials who testified to TRRC, these migrants were detained in the town of Barra on 22 July 2005, and then tortured in various detention centers around Banjul. The bodies of eight of the migrants were found near Ghana Town the following day, while two people escaped but disappeared on 24 July. The 40–45 survivors were summarily executed in Senegal, across the southern border from Jammeh's hometown of Kanilai, except for one survivor. Ex-Junglers who testified attributed the execution orders to Jammeh himself. The Jammeh administration proceeded to cover up the incident from Ghana and ECOWAS.

==== 2009 witch hunting campaign ====
In March 2009 Amnesty International reported that up to 1,000 Gambians had been abducted by government-sponsored "witch doctors" on charges of witchcraft, and taken to government detention centres where they were forced to drink dirty water with poisonous herbs; this left several captives with sequelae. On 21 May 2009, The New York Times reported that the alleged witch-hunting campaign had been sparked by the President Yahya Jammeh, who believed that the death of his aunt earlier that year could be attributed to witchcraft. These crimes were influenced by Bissauguinean president João Bernardo Vieira's assassination on 2 March 2009.

==== Disappearances and imprisonments ====
Newspaper reports list dozens of individuals who have disappeared after being picked up by men in plain-clothes, and others who have languished under indefinite detention for months or years without charge or trial. The regional Economic Community of West African States (ECOWAS) court ordered the Gambian government to produce one journalist who had disappeared. In April 2016, at least 50 people were arrested during a demonstration, and there were fears that Solo Sandeng, an opposition politician, died alongside two others while being held in detention. In July 2016, a Gambian opposition leader and another 18 people were sentenced to three years in jail for participation in the April demonstration. A Gambian diplomat publicly denied that Sandeng had died in custody.

=== 2014 coup attempt ===
On 30 December 2014, gunmen attacked the State House of the Gambia, the official presidential residence. Local media quickly identified them as having entered the country from neighbouring Senegal under the command of Lt Col. Lamin Sanneh. Yahya Jammeh ran away and was out of the country, with sources differing on whether he was in France or Dubai.

However, with the gunmen failing to consolidate control, the coup failed. Jammeh returned to Gambia the following day.

=== 2016 election, crisis and ECOWAS intervention ===
Ahead of the 2016 presidential election a number of opposition members, including United Democratic Party leader Ousainou Darboe, were sentenced to three years in jail for staging pro-democracy protests. In a public address, Jammeh called members of the opposition "opportunistic people supported by the West," adding that "I will bow to only Allah and my mother. I will never tolerate opposition to destabilize this country." The election itself took place on 1 December 2016 and, in a surprise result, Jammeh was defeated by Adama Barrow leading a coalition of opposition parties. At first, Jammeh stated that he would not contest the result.

Although Jammeh initially conceded defeat, on 9 December 2016 he rejected the result citing "unacceptable abnormalities". He subsequently announced that he had annulled the result, pending a new vote. He then filed a petition with the Supreme Court of the Gambia to contest the result. The court began hearing the case on 21 December. The Economic Community of West African States (ECOWAS) warned on 23 December that it would militarily intervene to uphold the results of the election if Jammeh didn't resign by 19 January. Jammeh appointed six new judges to the Supreme Court, having sacked all but one in 2015. The hearing was to be heard on 10 January, but was delayed until May. Jammeh stated that he would only relinquish the presidency if the court upheld the election result.

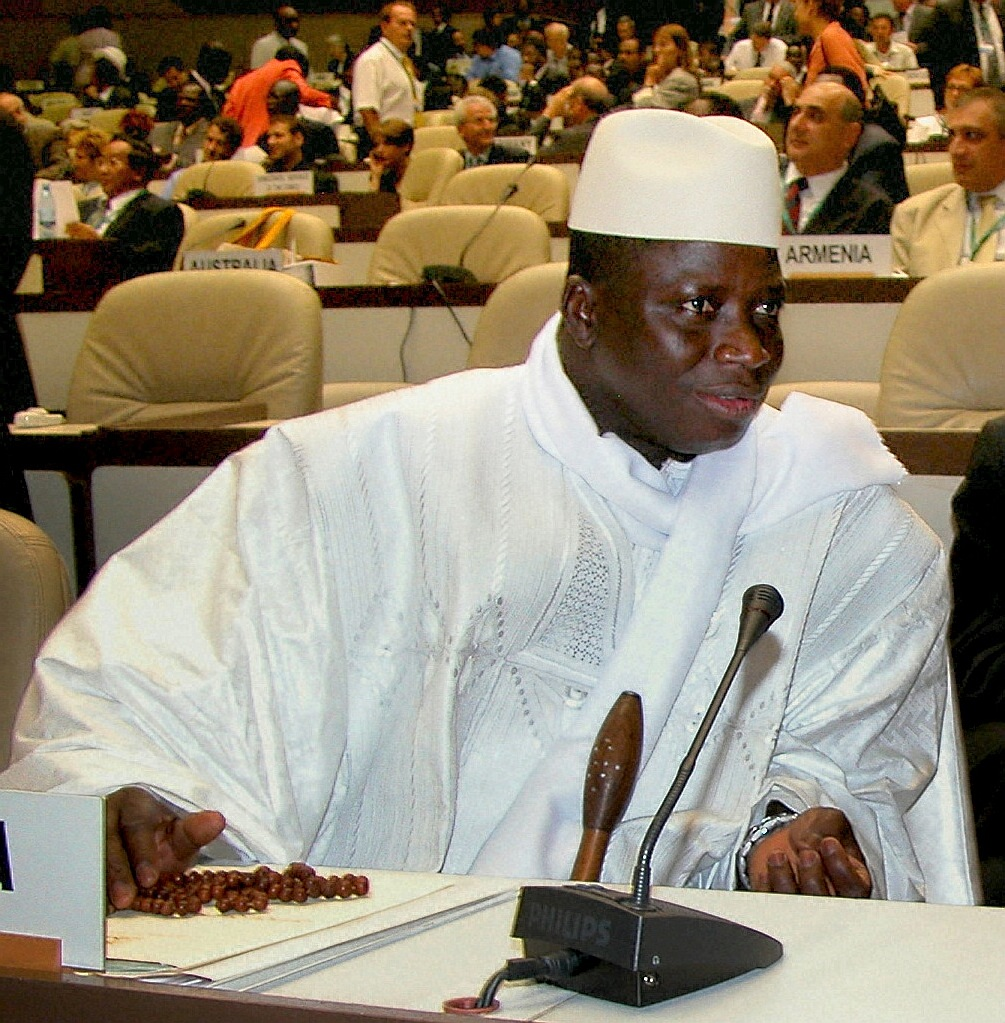
Yahya Jammeh.

The African Union additionally stated that it would stop recognising Jammeh as president as of 19 January 2017. He attempted to have Barrow's inauguration blocked, but the Chief Justice of the Supreme Court refused to rule on the matter. On Tuesday 17 January, he declared a 90-day state of emergency, prohibiting "acts of disobedience" and "acts intended to disturb public order". Various ministers resigned, and about 46,000 civilians (about 75% of whom were children) fled the country. Senegal, which was selected by ECOWAS to lead the operation to remove Jammeh from his post, moved its troops closer to the border with the Gambia on 18 January. Jammeh was warned to step down by midnight. Jammeh refused to step down and the deadline passed. On 18 January, parliament voted to extend Jammeh's term by three months, while in parallel, Adama Barrow was internationally recognised as president. On 19 January, Senegalese troops entered the Gambia. The United Nations Security Council approved a resolution backing Barrow while calling on Jammeh to step down. It backed ECOWAS' efforts to ensure that the results of the 2016 presidential election were respected by using political means first. Senegal halted its offensive, to allow mediation of the crisis one final time, with the invasion to proceed at noon on 20 January if Jammeh were to refuse to relinquish power. Jammeh again refused to step down and missed two deadlines on 20 January while regional leaders tried to persuade him to step down.

During the early hours of 21 January, Jammeh announced on state television that he was stepping down from the post of president, and left the country later on the same day, travelling to Guinea and then Equatorial Guinea.

=== Sexual abuse and rape allegations ===
Three women from Gambia accused the former president, Yahya Jammeh, of raping and sexually abusing them while still in office, as per rights advocacy group Human Rights Watch and TRIAL International. According to ex-Gambian officials, women were pressured by presidential aides regularly to visit and work for Jammeh. One of the women is a Gambian pageant winner who has accused the ex-president of raping her. The victim, Fatou "Toufah" Jallow said she met Jammeh when she was 18 years old after winning a beauty pageant in 2014.

As per Jallow, in the months that followed, Jammeh asked her to marry him at a dinner organized by one of his aides. Later, Fatou was invited by the former president via his aide to attend a religious ceremony at the State House. However, on her arrival the victim claims to have been taken to the president's private residence, where she was injected with a needle and "sodomized". In October 2019, Jallow testified before Gambia’s public Truth and Reconciliation Commission about the rape charges.

=== Terror ===
In 2018 the American treasury that designated Mohammad Ibrahim Bazzi as a terrorist and one of Hezbollah financier, linked him to Jammeh. Since 1997 Hezbollah is designated by the US as a terrorist organization, a fact that did not prevent him from doing business with the militant group and to provide protection to its financiers.

== Exile ==
As Jammeh left the Gambia on 21 January 2017, Barrow stated that a "truth and reconciliation commission" would be appointed to investigate any possible crimes committed by Jammeh. Barrow cautioned that the commission would not prosecute Jammeh, only investigate the alleged crimes. West African leaders did not guarantee any form of immunity to Jammeh. The United Nations, African Union and ECOWAS declared that any country offering refuge to him or his family would not be punished and he should be free to return to the country in the future. The statement added that it would work with the government of the Gambia to make sure that assets and properties legally belonging to him or his family, cabinet members, government officials or party supporters would not be seized. Jammeh later left the Gambia for Equatorial Guinea, where he allegedly lives in a mansion in the village of Mongomo.

After Jammeh went into exile, Adama Barrow's special adviser Mai Ahmad Fatty alleged that in late January 2017, Jammeh had stolen US$11.4 million from the state's treasury and used a cargo plane to ship out his luxury vehicles during his last week in power. He added that the state's treasury was virtually empty, which was confirmed by technicians in the Ministry of Finance as well as the Central Bank of the Gambia. About a month later, two senior ministers alleged that he had siphoned at least $50 million from social security, ports, and the national telecoms company. They also alleged that his private jet, which cost $4.5 million, was bought using the state's pension fund. The government stated that his actions had left the country with a debt of more than $1 billion. Reuters released a report regarding Jammeh's charity on 24 February 2017 in which it stated that funds from the Jammeh Foundation for Peace went to Jammeh himself, not to the foundation's projects. The Minister of Justice announced on 10 March that the government would launch an investigation into his finances including his personal use of a charity bank account.

A Gambian court froze Jammeh's known remaining assets in the Gambia in May 2017 after it emerged that he had siphoned off $50 million (~$64.5 million in 2025) of public money through the state-owned telecommunications company Gamtel to his own bank accounts during his presidency.

Effective 21 December 2017, US President Donald Trump issued an executive order under the Magnitsky Act that specifically named Yahya Jammeh among the persons whose US-based assets are to be blocked.

There also been some controversy in the Gambia over the revelation that Jammeh during his time in office allowed a Franco-Polish arms dealer Pierre Dadak to use jetliners belonging to the Gambian state to fly around Europe and Africa to conduct his business. Jammeh's private secretary Njogu Bah, who was present at the Jammeh-Dadak meetings, has refused interview requests from the Gambian media to explain why Dadak was allowed to use Gambian jets. In June 2018, the Gambian government decided to auction off his fleet of luxury cars and aircraft to raise money for health and education projects. On 27 July 2018, Jammeh's mother died in exile.

He was photographed in May 2019 accompanied by Teodoro Obiang Nguema Mbasogo. Jammeh had grown out his beard. The Equatoguinean opposition denounced the presence of this "annoying guest" claiming that "they do not want another dictator in the country".

On 12 January 2020, Jammeh was warned by Gambian officials not to return to the Gambia without permission, as his safety could not be guaranteed.

In August 2021, Adama Barrow sold one of Jammeh's presidential aircraft to a company in Belarus.

Exiled Jammeh endorsed his former rival Mama Kandeh in the 2021 Gambian presidential election.

In May 2022, the Government of the Gambia has accepted the recommendation to prosecute the exiled former president for killings and other crimes committed during his tenure of office. His $3.5m mansion in Potomac, Maryland was seized by the US Justice Department.

On 15 December 2024, ECOWAS approved, at a summit of heads of state, the creation of a special tribunal to try crimes committed during the presidency of Jammeh between 1994 and 2017.

== Personal life ==
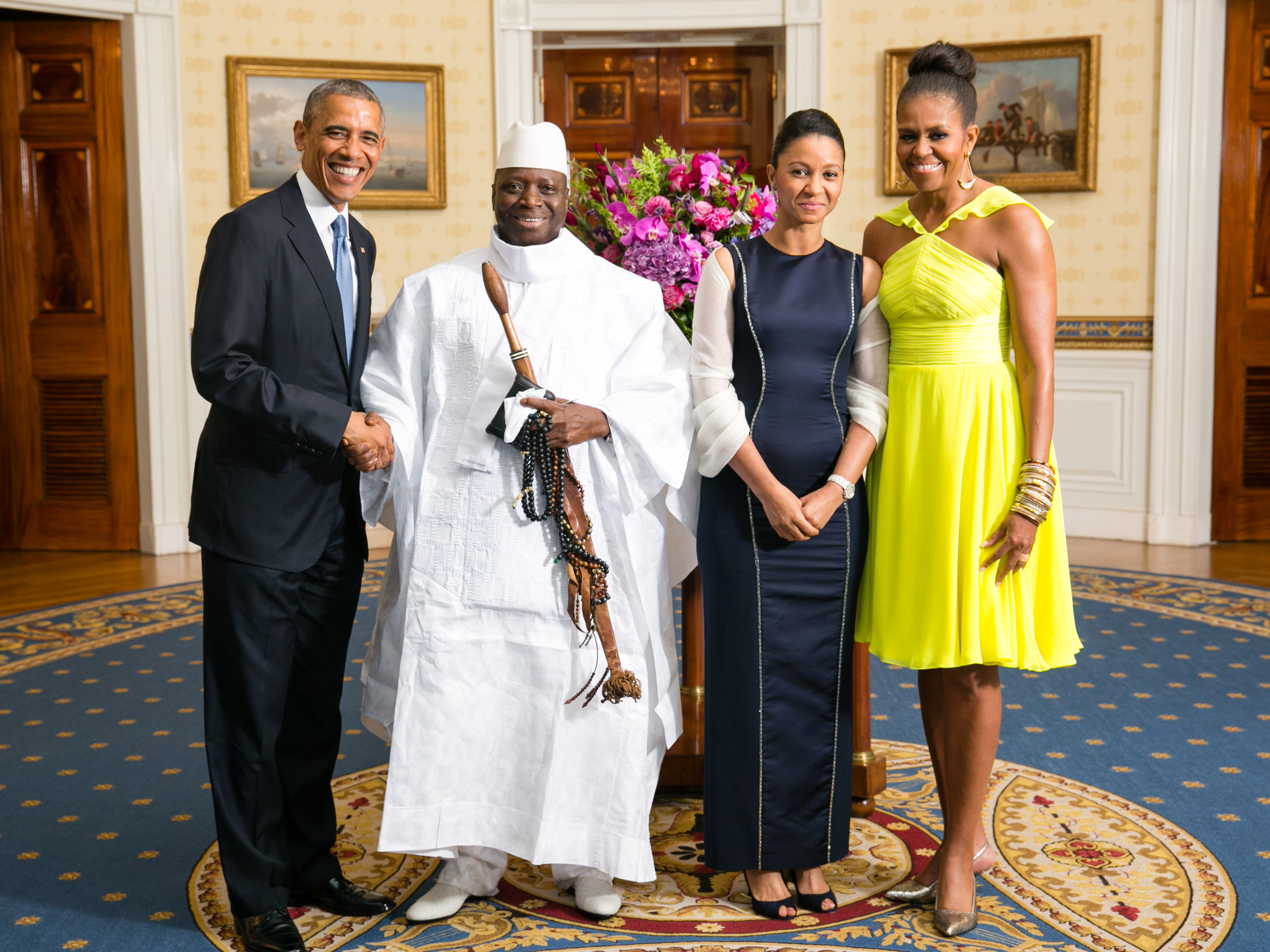
Yahya and Zeinab Jammeh with President Barack Obama and First Lady Michelle Obama in the White House, August 2014.

=== Marriages ===
Jammeh is an ethnic Jola. He briefly dated Tuti Faal, of Mauritanian descent, in 1994 before marrying her. She worked for the Gambia Telecommunication Company (GAMTEL) until the coup in July 1994. They had difficulty conceiving a child, and in 1999 Jammeh sent her to Saudi Arabia for a gynaecological exam, and during her time abroad, divorced her. Jammeh married his second wife Zeinab (Zineb) Suma Jammeh, on 26 March 1999. They have two children as of 2007, a daughter, Mariam Jammeh, and a son, Muhammed Yahya Jammeh. The latter was born in late 2007, when his daughter was eight years old.

On 30 September 2010, Jammeh announced his marriage to a 21-year-old (or possibly 18-year-old) additional wife by the name Alima Sallah, daughter of Omar Gibril Sallah, Gambia's Ambassador to Saudi Arabia, and Zahra Sallah. It was announced that his new wife would officially be referred to as Lady Alima Yahya Jammeh, and would not be referred to as a "first lady", since Zeinab Suma Jammeh was the official "first lady".

According to at least one source, his marriage to Sallah was a shock to his other wife Zeinab Suma Jammeh, and the additional marriage led to strains in their relationship and even plans for their divorce. Zeinab Jammeh had reportedly already been living in the US separately from her husband for some time. Sallah reportedly also left Gambia for the US in June 2010. According to the same publication, he then divorced Sallah in early 2011.

=== Religion ===
Jammeh, like the majority of Gambians, practises Islam. In July 2010, Jammeh stressed that people should believe in God: "If you don't believe in God, you can never be grateful to humanity and you are even below a pig." In 2011 he told the BBC, "I will deliver to the Gambian people and if I have to rule this country for one billion years, I will, if Allah says so." On 12 December 2015, Jammeh declared the Muslim-majority country to be an Islamic republic, saying the move marked a break with the Gambia's colonial past. Jammeh told state television that the proclamation was in line with Gambia's "religious identity and values". He added that no dress code would be imposed and citizens of other faiths would be allowed to practise freely. The State Religion is abolished by his successor Adama Barrow.

== Titles and styles ==
The official title used was His Excellency Sheikh Professor Alhaji Dr. Yahya Abdul-Aziz Awal Jemus Junkung Jammeh Naasiru Deen Babili Mansa. He was Commander in Chief of The Armed Forces and Chief Custodian of the Sacred Constitution of the Gambia.

On 16 June 2015, a statement from the State House stated that President Jammeh should be addressed as "His Excellency Sheikh Professor Alhaji Dr. Yahya A.J.J. Jammeh Babili Mansa". The title Babili Mansa, which the President decided to drop in December 2014, is a phrase in the Mandinka language that could be translated as either "Chief Bridge Builder" or "Conqueror of Rivers". Two months before, he had already removed the title Nasirul Deen ("Defender of the Faith"), which had been conferred to him by the Gambia Supreme Islamic Council.

== Awards and honours ==
=== Foreign honours ===
- Libya
  - Grand Commander of the Order of the Great 1st September Revolution (1995)
  - Order of Bravery (1998)
- Republic of China
  - Grand Cordon of the Order of Brilliant Jade (1996)
- Senegal
  - Grand Cross of the National Order of the Lion (2001)

=== Other awards and honours ===
Jammeh has received honorary doctorates from Saint Mary's University of Halifax in 1999 for providing his citizens "freedom to pursue their well-being, and to live in peace and harmony", St. Mary's College of Maryland in 2004, Universidad Empresarial de Costa Rica, Norman Academy, and National Taipei University of Technology. The honorary degree from Saint Mary's University in Halifax, Nova Scotia, was revoked by the University's Board of Governors in April 2022.

He has also received dubious awards through the International Parliament for Safety and Peace, an unrecognised higher education accreditation organisation. Among these was a Nebraska Admiral certificate; however, Rae Hein, a spokeswoman for the Governor of Nebraska, stated "We regret that this individual has attempted to embellish a certificate for a Nebraska admiralship, claiming that it was a high honour bestowed upon him by the governor, when to the best of our knowledge, this person has no relationship with or ties to Nebraska." IPSP representatives also gave Jammeh two awards and a letter from Barack Obama that were later described as inauthentic or non-existent. Jammeh also received "Russian" and "German" honorary degrees from members of the IPSP.

== Depiction on Gambian currency ==
Yahya Jammeh's portrait is depicted on some of the Gambian dalasi banknotes; 2014 polymer 20 Dalasis banknote commemorating 20 Years of his regime. The N.D. (2015) issue banknotes - 5 Dalasis up to 200 Dalasis. The face of Yahya Jammeh, which was printed on all bank notes in The Gambia, was removed from new bills in 2019.

== See also ==
- List of foreign ministers in 2017

== Notes ==
Political offices
Preceded by Sir Dawda Jawara	President of the Gambia; 1996–2017 military ruler: 1994–1996	Succeeded by Adama Barrow
