= Vice-President of the Gambia =

Deputy head of state of The Gambia

Vice-President of the Republic of The Gambia
- Coat of Arms

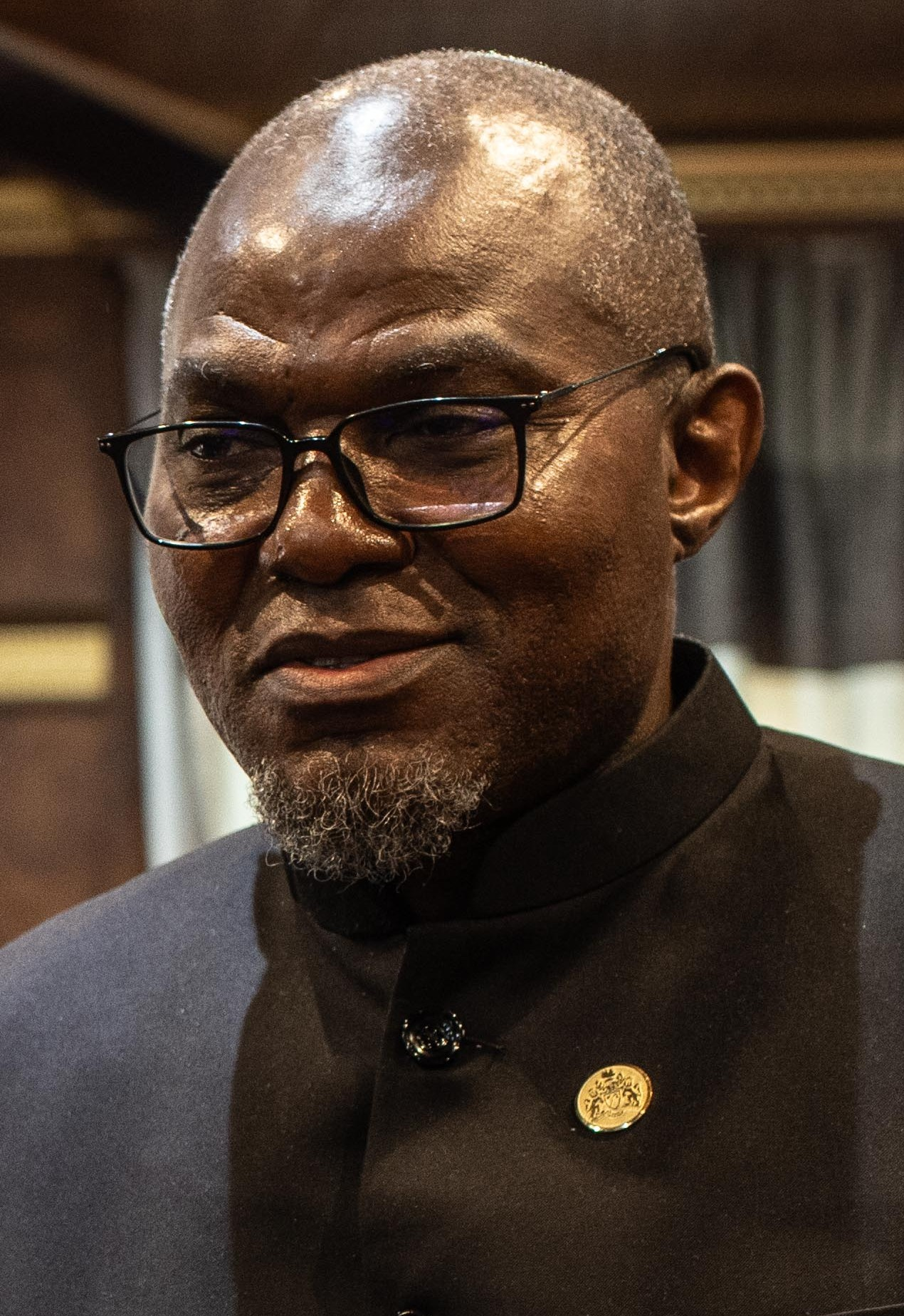
- Incumbent; Muhammad B. S. Jallow since 24 February 2023
- Appointer: President of the Gambia
- Term length: 5 years, renewable
- Inaugural holder: Sheriff Mustapha Dibba
- Formation: April 1970

The vice president of the Republic of the Gambia is the second highest political position in the Gambia. The office was created in April 1970, with the passing of the republican Constitution of the Gambia following the republic referendum. The vice president is appointed by the president and acts as constitutional successor of the president in the event of a vacancy.

The current vice president is Muhammad B. S. Jallow, who was appointed on 24 February 2023 following the death of his predecessor Badara Joof.

== List of vice-presidents ==
Political parties

People's Progressive Party (PPP)
Alliance for Patriotic Reorientation and Construction (APRC)
United Democratic Party (UDP)

Other factions

Independent

Status

Denotes acting vice president

Symbols

^{†} Died in office

Name (Birth–Death)	Portrait	Term of office		Political party	President
Sheriff Mustapha Dibba (1937–2008)		1970	February 1972	PPP	Dawda Jawara
Assan Musa Camara (1923–2013)		September 1972	1977	PPP	Dawda Jawara
Alieu Badara Njie (1904–1982)		1977	August 1978	PPP	Dawda Jawara
Assan Musa Camara (1923–2013)		August 1978	May 1982	PPP	Dawda Jawara
Bakary Bunja Darbo (born 1946)		12 May 1982	1992	PPP	Dawda Jawara
Saihou Sabally (born 1947)		1992	22 July 1994 (Deposed in a coup)	PPP	Dawda Jawara
Vacant (22 July 1994 – 20 March 1997)					Yahya Jammeh
Isatou Njie-Saidy (born 1952)		20 March 1997	18 January 2017 (Resigned)	APRC	Yahya Jammeh
Vacant (18 – 23 January 2017)					Adama Barrow
Fatoumata Tambajang (born 1949)		23 January 2017	9 November 2017	UDP	Adama Barrow
Fatoumata Tambajang (born 1949)		9 November 2017	29 June 2018	UDP	Adama Barrow
Ousainou Darboe (born 1948)		29 June 2018	15 March 2019	UDP	Adama Barrow
Isatou Touray (born 1955)		15 March 2019	4 May 2022	Independent	Adama Barrow
Badara Joof (1955–2023)		4 May 2022	17 January 2023^{[†]}	Independent	Adama Barrow
Vacant (17 January – 24 February 2023)					Adama Barrow
Muhammad B. S. Jallow (born 1960)		24 February 2023	Incumbent	Independent	Adama Barrow

== See also ==
- Politics of the Gambia
- President of the Gambia
- List of heads of state of the Gambia
- Edward Singateh, designated vice president in 1996, never confirmed
