= List of wars involving the Gambia =

This is a list of wars involving the Republic of the Gambia.

Conflict	Combatant 1	Combatant 2	Result
1981 Gambian coup d'état attempt (1981)	The Gambia; Senegal; Supported by: United Kingdom	Gambia Socialist Revolutionary Party	Coup d'état attempt fails: Dissolution of the Gambia Socialist Revolutionary Party; Emergence of the Senegambia Confederation
Casamance conflict (1994–2017)	MFDC: Three main factions (Sadio, Badiatte, and Diatta Groups); Various splinter factions; Guinea-Bissau rebels (1998–1999); Supported by: Guinea-Bissau (2000s, alleged); The Gambia (1994–2017)	Senegal; Guinea-Bissau (1998–1999)	Ceasefire: Unilateral ceasefire by most MFDC factions; Ongoing low-level violence
1994 Gambian coup d'état (1994)	(The Gambia) Government of the Gambia	Armed Forces faction Supported by: Libya (alleged)	Coup successful: Government of Dawda Jawara is overthrown; Military junta established; Yahya Jammeh installed as president
2014 Gambian coup d'état attempt (2014)	(The Gambia) Gambian Government: Military of the Gambia	Faction of the Presidential Guard	Coup failure
2016–17 Gambian constitutional crisis (2016–2017)	(The Gambia) Pro-Yahya Jammeh forces: Alliance for Patriotic Reorientation and Construction; (Casamance) MFDC; Foreign mercenaries	(The Gambia) Pro-Barrow forces: Coalition 2016; Gambian Navy (from 19 January 2017); ECOWAS military intervention (from 19 January 2017): Senegal; Nigeria; Ghana; Mali; Togo	Pro-Barrow and ECOWAS victory: Adama Barrow is sworn-in as President of The Gambia in The Gambian embassy in Dakar, Senegal, and requests military support from ECOWAS.; ECOWAS assembles a coalition of forces from Senegal, Nigeria, and Ghana, and militarily intervenes without resistance from pro-Jammeh forces.; Jammeh leaves the country as forces approach Banjul, and Barrow arrives as President days later.; Continued ECOWAS military presence in the country

== Bibliography ==
- Minahan, James (2002). Encyclopedia of the Stateless Nations: Ethnic and National Groups Around the World: A-C. Greenwood Publishing Group. ISBN 0-313-32109-4.
