= United Nations Security Council Resolution 2337 =

UN Security Council Resolution 2337
- Map of the Gambia
- Date: 19 January 2017
- Meeting no.: 7,866
- Code: S/RES/2337 (Document)
- Subject: 2016–2017 Gambian constitutional crisis

Voting
- Summary: 15 voted for; None voted against; None abstained
- Result: Adopted

Security Council composition
- Permanent members: China; France; Russia; United Kingdom; United States
- Non-permanent members: Bolivia; Egypt; Ethiopia; Italy; Japan; Kazakhstan; Senegal; Sweden; Ukraine; Uruguay

United Nations Security Council Resolution 2337 was a measure unanimously adopted by the United Nations Security Council (UNSC) on 19 January 2017. It expressed support for efforts by ECOWAS to peacefully resolve the 2016–2017 Gambian constitutional crisis, calling on President Yahya Jammeh to step down and allow a peaceful transition to the President-elect, Adama Barrow, as well as supporting the African Union and ECOWAS decisions in recognizing Adama Barrow as the new president. The measure was adopted by a vote of 15 supporting, none opposed, and none abstained.

== Background ==
=== The Gambian constitutional crisis ===
The Gambia's presidential elections were held on 1 December 2016 with the Independent Electoral Commission previously accepting three nominees in November 2016 which included Yahya Jammeh of the Alliance for Patriotic Reorientation and Reconstruction (APRC), Adama Barrow of Coalition 2016, and Mama Kandeh of the Gambia Democratic Congress, respectively.

On 2 December 2016, Yahya Jammeh conceded defeat to the electoral candidate Adama Barrow. However, on the 9 December, Yahya Jammeh rejected the election results, sparking the Gambian constitutional crisis. He refused to step down and allow Barrow to accede to the presidency, and demanded to remain in power until new elections could be organized and conducted.

=== Resolution background ===
The situation in the Gambia had escalated to crisis proportions, including the displacement of about 46,000 people who had fled the Gambia to neighbouring Senegal and Guinea-Bissau. President-Elect Barrow himself had left for Senegal due to fear for this safety in the Gambia and had not even been able to return for the funeral of his 8-year-old son, who died unexpectedly during this period after being attacked by dogs. More than 75% of the displaced people arriving in Senegal were children, accompanied primarily by women.

Earlier on the same day the resolution was passed, Barrow was sworn in as President of Gambia in the Gambian embassy in Dakar, Senegal.

The resolution did not endorse the ECOWAS military intervention in the Gambia, which also occurred on the same day the resolution was passed. Rather, it requested ECOWAS to pursue "political means first" in its efforts to resolve the crisis. In earlier proposed drafts, the council had considered alternative language endorsing ECOWAS in "all necessary measures", which would have been an endorsement for military action. However, some members of the council, including Egypt, Bolivia, and Russia, had objected to the stronger language. In its press release, the Council said that "A number of speakers ... said the adoption did not imply the Council's endorsement of possible military measures", and specifically mentioned that Egypt and Bolivia had expressed this view.

The resolution followed a previous unanimous United Nations Security Council statement issued on 10 December 2016 that had similarly called on Jammeh to "respect the choice of the sovereign people of The Gambia" and allow Barrow to accede to the presidency. The UN Secretary-General Ban Ki-moon also released a statement on 10 December expressing dismay at Jammeh's rejection of the results of the election. The Secretary-General had previously commended the peaceful election process in the Gambia, and had congratulated President-elect Adama Barrow on his victory on 2 December 2016.

== Passage of the resolution ==
The resolution was passed by a vote of 15 supporting, none opposed, and none abstained.

== Aftermath ==
On the same day the resolution was passed, armed forces from the ECOWAS countries of Senegal, Nigeria, and Ghana cooperated to enter the Gambia with ground forces, a naval blockade, and air support in a military intervention to compel Jammeh's departure. The army and navy of the Gambia did not resist, as the navy declared support for Barrow and the army said the matter was political in nature and it would stay neutral. After a few hours and only minor clashes with pro-Jammeh MFDC forces near the border village of Kanilai, the home town of Yahya Jammeh, the incursion was halted to allow a final attempt to negotiate the peaceful departure of Jammeh. Two days later, on 21 January 2017, Jammeh agreed to step down and left the Gambia for exile in Equatorial Guinea. There were no reports of casualties. About 4,000 ECOWAS troops remained in the Gambia to establish order in preparation for Barrow to return and consolidate his presidency.

== See also ==
- History of the Gambia
- President of the Gambia
- List of United Nations Security Council Resolutions 2301 to 2400
