= ECOWAS military intervention in the Gambia =

Ongoing military intervention in Western Africa

- Part of the 2016–2017 Gambian constitutional crisis (first three days of the intervention)
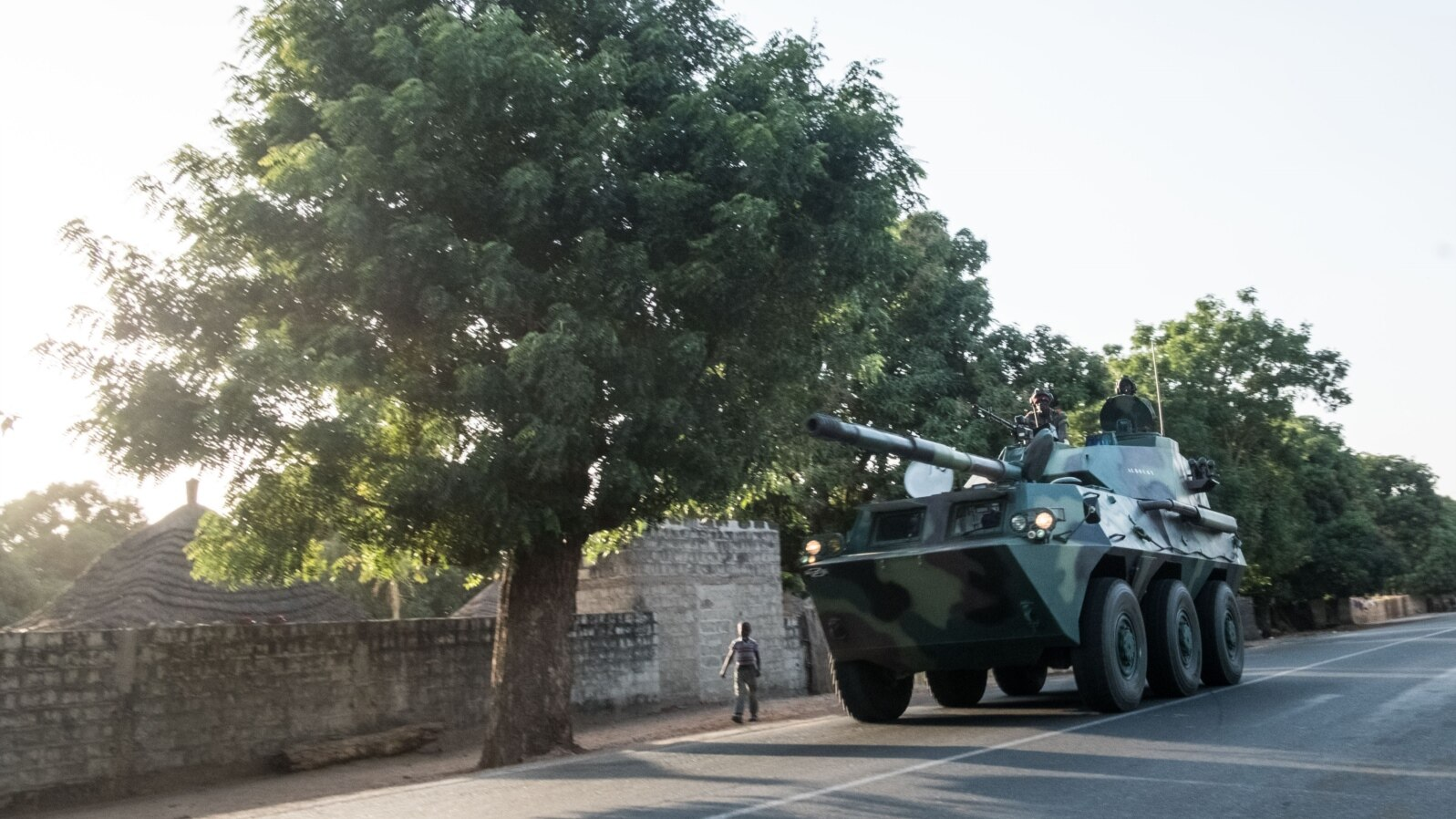
- Top: Senegalese army troops gather at the border with Gambia on 19 January; Bottom: The Gambia; ECOWAS Coalition
Date	19 January 2017 – Present
Location	The Gambia
Result	Ongoing; Amidst the 2016–2017 Gambian constitutional crisis, ECOWAS intervenes in the country militarily (at the request of Adama Barrow) without resistance from pro-Jammeh forces; Jammeh leaves the country as forces approach Banjul, and Barrow arrives as President days later; 2,500 ECOWAS troops remain in The Gambia; Clash between ECOWAS forces and alleged Pro-Jammeh elements in The Gambian military in April 2017; Protests against continued presence of ECOWAS forces; Clash between ECOWAS forces and MFDC Senegalese rebels on the Gambia–Senegal border in January 2022

Belligerents
Pro-Jammeh forces; APRC supporters; MFDC; Foreign mercenaries; Protestors against continued ECOWAS presence	ECOWAS forces; Senegal; Nigeria; Ghana; Mali (until 2020); Togo; Pro-Barrow forces; Coalition 2016 supporters; Gambian Navy

Commanders and leaders
Yahya Jammeh (surrendered); Benjamin Yeaten	Adama Barrow; Macky Sall; Muhammadu Buhari; Nana Akufo-Addo; Ibrahim Boubacar Keïta; Faure Gnassingbé

Strength
~2,000 soldiers	~8,000 soldiers

Casualties and losses
- 4 ECOWAS soldiers, 1 MFDC rebel and 2 civilians killed; 3 alleged Pro-Jammeh Gambian soldiers, 1 ECOWAS soldier and 10 civilians wounded; 7 ECOWAS soldiers and 3 MFDC rebels taken prisoner and subsequently released; Some people remain displaced after 26,000–45,000 people fled during the 2016-2017 Gambian constitutional crisis and another 1,000 displaced during a clash in 2022

The ECOWAS military intervention in the Gambia or the ECOWAS Mission in The Gambia (abbreviated ECOMIG) – initially code-named Operation Restore Democracy – is an ongoing military intervention in The Gambia by several member states of the Economic Community of West African States.

Troops from ECOWAS entered The Gambia in January 2017 following long-time Gambian President Yahya Jammeh's refusal to step down after his loss in the 2016 presidential election to Adama Barrow. This ultimately ended the 2016-17 Gambian constitutional crisis.

Forces entered the country on 19 January at the request of Barrow, who was sworn in that day as the new president at the Gambian embassy in Dakar, Senegal. As troops reached the capital, Banjul, Jammeh stepped down and left the country. Following his departure, 4,000 ECOWAS troops remained in The Gambia to maintain order in preparation for Barrow to return and consolidate his presidency. A week after his inauguration, Barrow returned to the country while requesting the 2,500 troops stay for at least six months to help him firmly establish order. He has renewed this request several times, and ECOWAS forces still remain in the country as of June 2025, training and assisting domestic security forces.

Although there were some reports of isolated minor clashes during the first few hours of the military incursion in January 2017, there were no reports of casualties in the initial conflict. In the following months, two civilians were reported to have been killed in incidents surrounding protests against the continued military presence in the community. In January 2022, a clash occurred between ECOWAS forces and MFDC Senegalese rebels on The Gambia–Senegal border, with four ECOWAS soldiers and one MFDC rebel killed. The clash was reported to have temporarily displaced approximately 1,000 people.

== Intervention (19–21 January 2017) ==
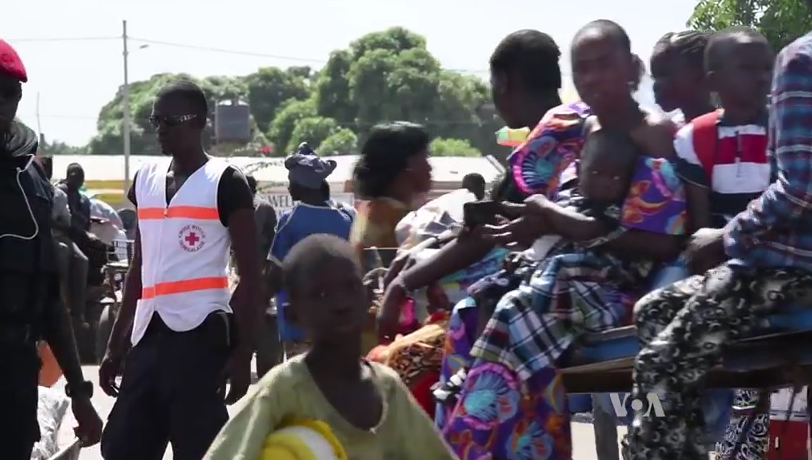
Some 45,000 refugees fled across the border into Senegal after Jammeh's refusal to step down on 18 January.

The Economic Community of West African States (ECOWAS) decided to intervene militarily in the Gambian constitutional crisis that occurred as a result of Gambian President Yahya Jammeh refusing to step down after losing the December 2016 presidential election, and set 19 January 2017 as the date the troops would move into the Gambia if Jammeh continued to refuse to step down. The operation was named "Operation Restore Democracy". ECOWAS forces were amassed around the borders of the Gambia, and Marcel Alain de Souza, the president of ECOWAS, said, "By land, sea and air, (the) Gambia is surrounded. A total of 7,000 men will participate in the mission to re-establish democracy in Gambia." In contrast, the entire armed forces of the Gambia numbered only about 2,500 troops.

On 19 January, Adama Barrow, who had been staying in Senegal due to fear for his safety in the Gambia, was sworn in as President in the Gambian embassy in Dakar, Senegal.

Just after Barrow was sworn in, the United Nations Security Council (UNSC) unanimously approved UNSC Resolution 2337 on the same day, which expressed support for ECOWAS efforts to negotiate the transition of the presidency, but requested the use of "political means first" without endorsing military action.

Despite the lack of endorsement of military action by the UNSC, Senegalese armed forces entered the Gambia on the same day, along with some forces from Ghana, with air and sea support from the Air Force and Navy of Nigeria. Gambia was placed under a naval blockade.

In the early hours of the offensive, clashes took place near the border village of Kanilai, the home town of Yahya Jammeh, between Senegalese and pro-Jammeh MFDC forces, and Senegal reportedly took control of the village. Senegal halted its offensive in order to provide a final chance to mediate the crisis, with the invasion planned to proceed at noon on 20 January if Jammeh still refused to relinquish power.

According to a statement given by the United Nations Refugee Agency on 20 January based on estimates provided by the government of Senegal, around 45,000 people had been displaced and had fled to Senegal, and at least 800 more people had fled to Guinea-Bissau. More than 75% of the displaced people arriving in Senegal were children, with the remainder being mostly women.

Jammeh, however, refused to step down even after the deadline passed. The deadline was extended to 16:00 GMT which too he missed. Mauritanian President Mohamed Ould Abdel Aziz, Guinean president Alpha Condé and United Nations' regional chief Mohammed Ibn Chambas tried to persuade him to step down. Gambia's army chief General Ousman Badjie meanwhile pledged allegiance to Barrow and stated that the Gambian Army would not fight ECOWAS. Barrow and a Senegalese official later stated that Jammeh had agreed to step down. Diplomats meanwhile stated that Senegalese troops would remain deployed at the border in case he reneged on the deal. A deal was later announced for him to leave the country for exile, and a short time later he announced on state television that he was stepping down.

== Stabilisation (21 January 2017–present) ==
After Jammeh went into exile on 21 January (initially going to Guinea and then to Equatorial Guinea), ECOWAS announced that about 4,000 of its troops would remain stationed in the country for ensuring security.

On 26 January 2017, Barrow returned to the Gambia, while about 2,500 ECOWAS troops remained in the country to stabilise it. He requested the troops to remain in the country for an additional six months. The troops remained in Banjul, and at important locations such as the port and airport as well as at the main crossing points to Senegal.

On 8 February 2017, the Gambian presidential office announced that the mandate of the mission would be extended by three more months. President of Ghana Nana Akufo-Addo stated in mid-February that the number of Ghanaian soldiers deployed for stabilisation of Gambia will be downsized to 50.

On 21 April 2017, ECOWAS forces clashed with Gambian soldiers loyal to former leader Yahya Jammeh, shooting and injuring three who were guarding graves at his home. A Gambia Armed Forces spokesman said there was a misunderstanding and an investigation is in progress. One civilian was declared by Gambian government to have been killed in Kanilai in a protest against ECOWAS forces while a civilian and an ECOMIG officer was declared to be injured on 2 June, with 22 arrests made.

On 2 June 2017, one protester was shot dead and nine were wounded by Senegalese soldiers in Kanilai after soldiers opened fire on protesters in what they described as "self-defense" during a protest in which thousands participated against the heavy military presence in their community.

The term of the ECOWAS military mission was extended by a year on 5 June 2017, with it being further extended until 2021. It was then continuously extended, and ECOWAS forces still remain in the country as of June 2025.

The public has been lukewarm to the continued presence of ECOWAS forces, with polls showing over 50% of the Gambian public wanting them to leave the country. President Barrow has argued that the continued presence of foreign forces are there to provide support and training to Gambian forces and that there is no cost to the Gambian people.

In January 2022, a clash occurred between ECOWAS forces and MFDC Senegalese rebels on The Gambia–Senegal border, with four ECOWAS soldiers and one MFDC rebel killed. The clash was reported to have temporarily displaced approximately 1,000 people. A total of 10 combatants were taken prisoner and subsequently released.

== Participating forces ==
The intervention force was composed of Senegalese, Ghanaian, Malian, Togolese and Nigerian forces. Nigeria provided aircraft and naval assets.

The Gambian army chief declared that the army would not involve itself in a political dispute, while the navy chose to declare its support for Barrow. However, some paramilitaries and mercenaries stayed loyal to Jammeh.

The Senegalese rebel group Movement of Democratic Forces of Casamance reportedly joined pro-Jammeh forces and there were reported clashes on the border with Senegal.

== International response ==
- United States Assistant Secretary of State for Public Affairs John Kirby announced that the United States was supportive of the intervention.
- The United Kingdom's Secretary of State for Foreign and Commonwealth Affairs Boris Johnson called on Jammeh to step down and praised "African organisations which are working to ensure the democratic wishes of the Gambian people will be respected", adding that the presidential elections had been free and fair.
- (China) The Chinese Ministry of Foreign Affairs called for a "cool-headed" and calm resolution to the conflict.
- The UN Security Council voted unanimously on 19 January 2017 to pass United Nations Security Council Resolution 2337 requesting a peaceful transition of power. The resolution did not endorse the use of military force. It instead requested ECOWAS to pursue "political means first".
