= 2016–2017 Gambian constitutional crisis =

Gambian crisis

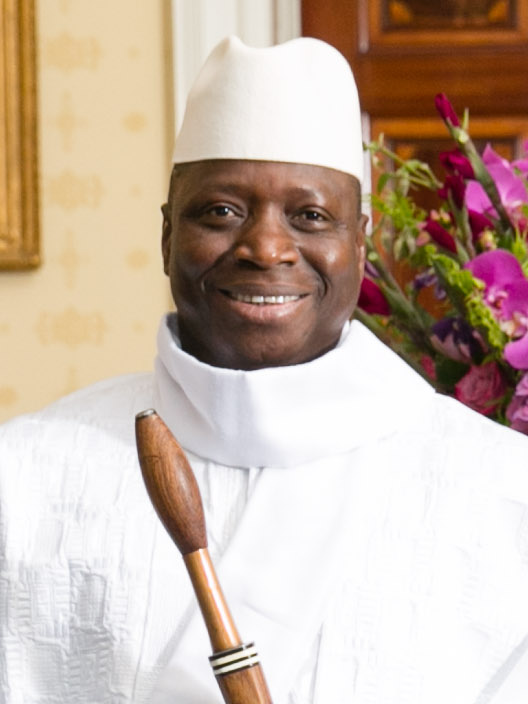
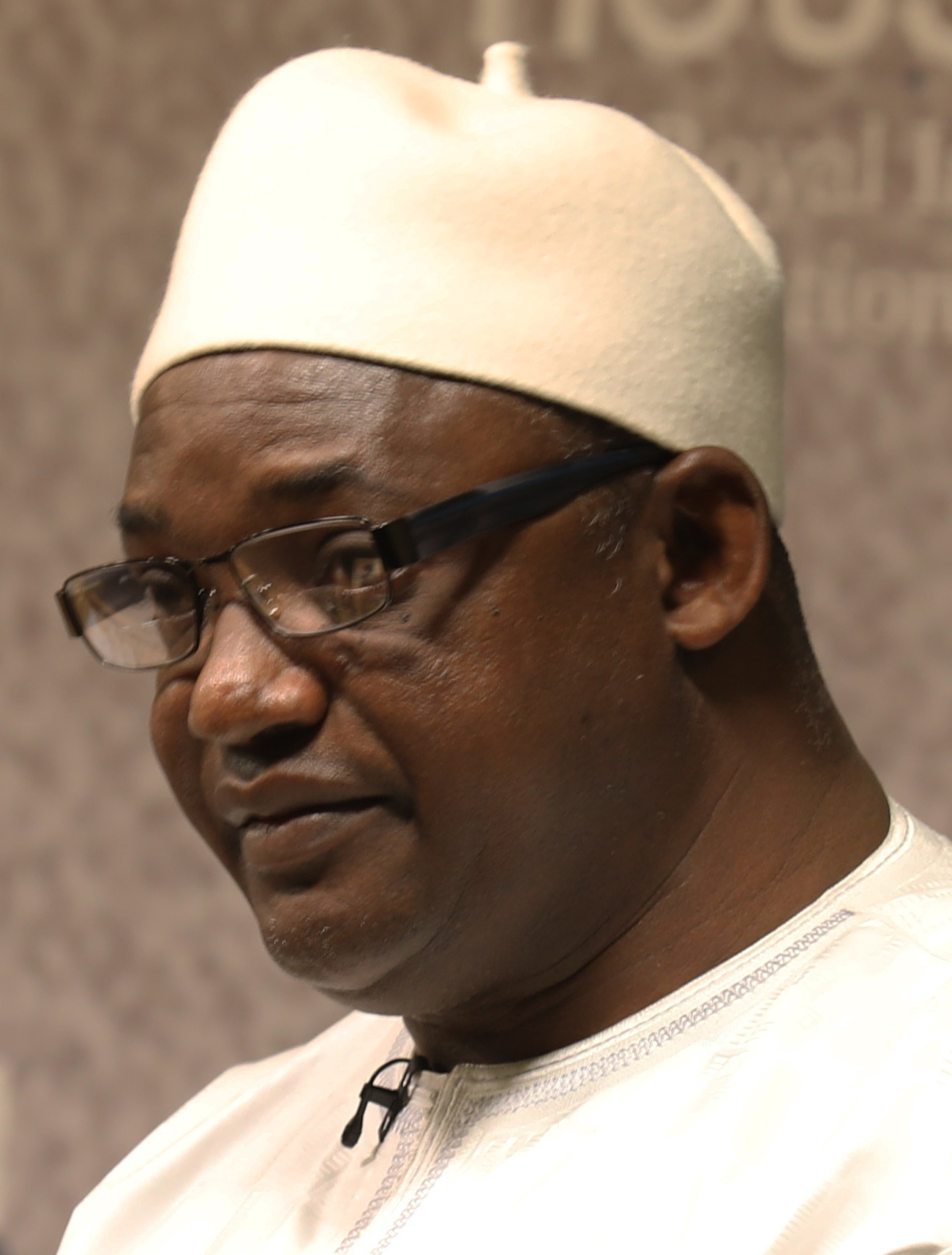
- Yahya Jammeh Adama Barrow
- Date: 9 December 2016 – 21 January 2017 (1 month, 1 week and 5 days)
- Location: The Gambia
- Result: Pro-Barrow and ECOWAS victory: Adama Barrow is sworn-in as President of The Gambia in The Gambian embassy in Dakar, Senegal, and requests military support from ECOWAS.; ECOWAS assembles a coalition of forces from Senegal, Nigeria, and Ghana, and militarily intervenes without resistance from pro-Jammeh forces.; Jammeh leaves the country as forces approach Banjul, and Barrow arrives as President days later.; Continued ECOWAS military presence in the country

Parties
(The Gambia) Pro-Yahya Jammeh forces: Alliance for Patriotic Reorientation and Construction; (Casamance) MFDC; Foreign mercenaries	(The Gambia) Pro-Barrow forces: Coalition 2016; Gambian Navy (from 19 January 2017); ECOWAS military intervention (from 19 January 2017): Senegal; Nigeria; Ghana; Mali; Togo

Lead figures
(The Gambia) Yahya Jammeh	(The Gambia) Adama Barrow (Senegal) Macky Sall (Nigeria) Muhammadu Buhari (Ghana) Nana Akufo-Addo (Mali) Ibrahim Boubacar Keïta (Togo) Faure Gnassingbé
- 26,000–45,000 people displaced

A constitutional crisis occurred in The Gambia following presidential elections in December 2016, in which challenger Adama Barrow achieved an upset victory over longtime incumbent Yahya Jammeh. It eventually concluded after a military intervention by the Economic Community of West African States (ECOWAS) led to Jammeh's departure from the country.

Although Jammeh first accepted the victory of Adama Barrow on 1 December, he rejected the election results days later. Jammeh called for the election to be annulled, and appealed to the Supreme Court, which refused to rule on the matter. He then deployed troops to the capital of Banjul and the city of Serekunda. The National Assembly, where Jammeh's Alliance for Patriotic Reorientation and Construction held an absolute majority, used emergency measures to extend Jammeh's rule.

The United Nations and ECOWAS, which The Gambia joined under Jammeh's rule, called on him to step down. After he refused, ECOWAS assembled a coalition of military forces from Senegal, Nigeria, and Ghana to intervene in The Gambia using special provisions in the organisation's charter. Jammeh's term was initially scheduled to end on 19 January, and Barrow was sworn in as President of The Gambia in his country's embassy in Senegal. At his request, ECOWAS troops entered the country that day without resistance of the National Army or the National Guard. The Navy explicitly recognised Barrow as president. ECOWAS troops reached Banjul on 21 January, and Jammeh left the country to exile in Equatorial Guinea. Barrow arrived to The Gambia as president on 26 January.

== Initial reactions ==
Following the announcement of the results of the elections, opposition supporters widely celebrated the surprise victory and were stunned by Jammeh's concession of defeat. Thousands of people celebrated in the streets of Banjul. However, some expressed caution about what Jammeh might do next – suggesting that he could still try to retain power despite what had happened. A businessman said "I will only believe it when I see him leaving state house. He still controls the army, and his family are the top brass."

A few days after the election, 19 opposition prisoners were released, including Ousainou Darboe, the leader of Barrow's United Democratic Party. Darboe had been arrested in April 2016 and sentenced to three years in prison, and his arrest had led to Barrow's candidacy.

Interviewed shortly after the election, Barrow thanked the Gambian people, including those in the diaspora outside of the country, and appealed to them to put aside their differences and work together for the development of their country. He said, "I know Gambians are in hurry but not everything is going to be achieved in one day. I would therefore appeal to all Gambians and friends of the Gambia to join us and help move this great country forward. I don't want this change of regime to be a mere change. I want it to be felt and seen in the wellbeing of the country and all Gambians. So we are calling on all Gambians and friends of the Gambia to help us make the Gambia great again."

Barrow said his early priorities include helping the agriculture sector. He said "We don't have minerals here. The backbone of this country is agriculture. ... Under President Yahya's government, all those farming centres collapsed completely, and they no longer exist." Asked about his plans for judicial reform, he said "We want a free and independent judiciary whereby nobody can influence the judiciary. We will put laws in place to protect those people running the judiciary. They will have that job security, they will have that independence. We will reduce the powers of the president."

== Jammeh rejects results ==
On 9 December 2016, Jammeh appeared on Gambian state television to announce that he had "decided to reject the outcome of the recent election" due to "serious and unacceptable abnormalities ... during the electoral process". He said that a new election should be held under "a god-fearing and independent electoral commission". The announcement came after Fatoumata Jallow-Tambajang, the chair of the opposition coalition, called for Jammeh's prosecution within a year after the handing over of power in January 2017, and said "We are going to have a national commission for asset recovery" to obtain the return of money and property from Jammeh and his family.

By 10 December, the military of the Gambia was deployed in key locations in Banjul, the capital, and set up sandbagged positions with machine guns, although they were just waving the citizenry through the checkpoints. Troops were also deployed in Serekunda, the Gambia's largest city. The Guardian's African correspondent speculated that the prospect of prosecution under a new government might have led security and military leaders to back Jammeh. An attempt by Economic Community of West African States (ECOWAS) chair and President of Liberia Ellen Johnson Sirleaf to negotiate a resolution to the dispute failed when Sirleaf's plane was not allowed to enter the country.

Jammeh's party, the Alliance for Patriotic Reorientation and Construction (APRC), said it would follow up Jammeh's statement by petitioning the Supreme Court to invalidate the election results, meeting a 10-day deadline established by law for contesting an election. There is currently a Chief Justice of the Gambia, but there has not been an active Supreme Court in the country for a year and a half (since May 2015), and it was thought that at least four additional judges would have to be appointed in order for the Supreme Court to convene to hear the case. According to human rights groups interviewed by Reuters, Jammeh wields considerable influence over the courts. Of the three Chief Justices between 2013 and 2015, one was jailed, another was dismissed, while the third fled the country after acquitting someone whom Jammeh had wanted to be convicted. Alieu Momarr Njai, the head of the elections commission, said that if it went to court, they would be able to show that the final tally was correct.

On 13 December, security forces took over the offices of the election commission and prevented the chief of the commission and its staff entering the building. The APRC submitted its appeal seeking the invalidation of the results. Meanwhile, the four regional leaders sent by ECOWAS met with Jammeh but left without an agreement. The military ceased its occupation of the electoral commission's offices in late December and the government said that its staff was free to return to work. It said that the occupation was intended to prevent an attack on the building. It also called for calm and said that daily life should continue as usual. In his 2017 New Year address, Jammeh furiously criticized the position taken by ECOWAS, saying that "it is totally illegal as it violates the principle of non-interference in the internal affairs of member states" and "is in effect a declaration of war and an insult to our constitution". He vowed that he was "ready to defend this country against any aggression and there will be no compromise for that".

=== Domestic reactions ===
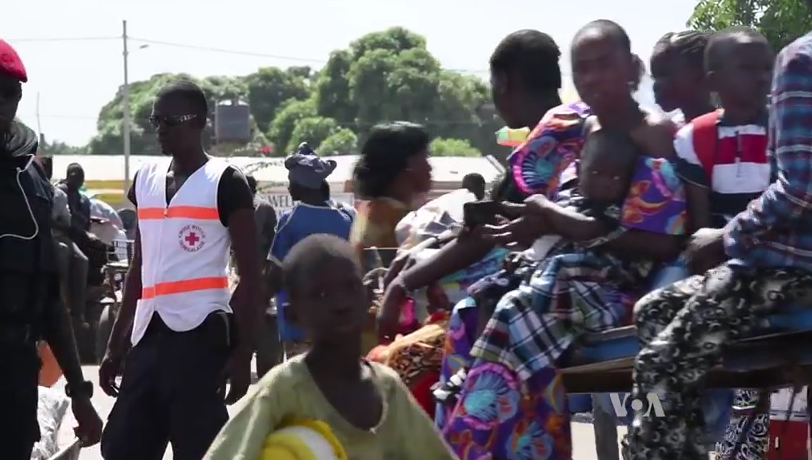
Some of the more than 26,000 refugees who have fled across the border into Senegal since Jammeh's refusal to step down, 18 January.

On the same day as Jammeh's rejection of the results, Barrow said that Jammeh did not have the constitutional authority to nullify the vote and call for new elections, arguing that only the Independent Electoral Commission could do that. Barrow said he had moved to a safe house for protection. According to supporters protecting Barrow's residence, the police and military of the Gambia had declined to protect the president-elect. The third candidate in the election, Mamma Kandeh, also called on Jammeh to step down, saying "Your swift decision earlier to concede defeat and your subsequent move to call Adama Barrow to congratulate him was lauded throughout the world. We therefore prevail on you to reconsider your decision."

On 12 December, the Gambia bar association held an emergency meeting. They called Jammeh's rejection of the election results "tantamount to treason" and passed a unanimous resolution calling for the resignation of the Chief Justice of the Supreme Court, Nigerian judge Emmanuel Oluwasegun Fagbenle, for gross misconduct, saying he had shown a lack of independence and impartiality by campaigning for Jammeh and inappropriately interfering with decisions made by judicial officials. The Gambia teachers' union called Jammeh's action "a recipe for chaos and disorder which undoubtedly endangers the lives of all Gambians particularly our children". The Gambia Press Union, the University of the Gambia, and the country's medical association and Supreme Islamic Council also supported the view that Jammeh should step aside and allow Barrow to assume the presidency. On 20 December, twelve serving Gambian ambassadors sent a congratulatory letter to Barrow and called on Jammeh to step down. In response, Jammeh's new Information Minister, Seedy Njie said on 10 January 2017 that the twelve ambassadors had been fired.

On 13 January, Barrow said that Jammeh should not seek asylum in Nigeria, which had been suggested by some MPs in the Nigerian Parliament. President Buhari of Nigeria continued trying to negotiate a peaceful end to the impasse. Barrow also stated that he would still be inaugurated on 19 January, despite the dispute. Talks aimed at ending the crisis ended without agreement on 14 January, prompting the African Union (AU) to state that it would no longer recognise Jammeh as president of The Gambia after 19 January. Barrow was instead invited to a regional summit in Mali to further discuss the transition of power. Barrow himself went to Senegal in the days before his inauguration, due to concerns for his safety. He also suffered a personal tragedy during this period when his 8-year-old son died after being bitten by dogs. Barrow missed the boy's funeral on 16 January 2017, as he did not feel safe to return to The Gambia to attend.

=== International reactions ===
Jammeh's action was condemned by the governments of the US and Senegal. The AU also declared that Jammeh's actions were "null and void". After Senegal called for an emergency United Nations Security Council (UNSC) meeting, the UNSC declared in a unanimous statement that Jammeh must peacefully hand over power.

It was announced that a delegation of four West African heads of state planned to go to The Gambia on 13 December to try to persuade Jammeh to accept the results of the election and step down. These included the President of Liberia and chair of ECOWAS Ellen Johnson Sirleaf, the President of Nigeria Muhammadu Buhari, the (outgoing) President of Ghana John Mahama, and the President of Sierra Leone Ernest Bai Koroma. The African Union said it also planned to send a negotiating delegation to The Gambia, led by President of Chad and chair of the AU Idriss Déby. Federica Mogherini, the High Representative of the European Union for Foreign Affairs and Security Policy, issued a statement saying that the European Union requested Jammeh to respect the outcome of the election and step down, and that "Any attempt to reverse carries the risk of serious consequences." Samantha Power, the United States Ambassador to the United Nations, said "It is a very dangerous moment."

On 14 December, United Nations officials said that Jammeh would not be allowed to remain head of state and would face strong sanctions if he continues to try to do so after his current term expires. Mohamed Ibn Chambas, the United Nations Special Representative for West Africa and the Sahel said "For Mr. Jammeh, the end is here and under no circumstances can he continue to be president. By that time (18 Jan.), his mandate is up and he will be required to hand over to Mr. Barrow." Ban Ki-moon, the Secretary-General of the United Nations, said the refusal to accept the election result was an "outrageous act of disrespect of the will of the Gambian people". When asked whether the U.N. would consider military action to force Jammeh's departure, Chambas did not rule out the possibility – saying only "It may not be necessary. Let's cross that bridge when we get there."

On 16 December, ECOWAS issued a statement saying that Barrow "must be sworn in" in order to "respect the will of the Gambian people", and that "The authority [ECOWAS] shall undertake all necessary actions to enforce the result of the election." ECOWAS appointed Muhammadu Buhari as its chief mediator for the dispute, and appointed John Mahama as co-mediator. On 19 December, the AU expressed its full support of the position taken by ECOWAS. Idriss Déby, chair of the AU, called ECOWAS's position a "principled stand with regards to the situation in The Gambia".

Despite pressure from regional leaders, Jammeh, speaking on television on the evening of 20 December, said that he would not leave office at the end of his term in January unless the Supreme Court of the Gambia upheld the results. He again insisted that a new election was necessary: "I will not cheat but I will not be cheated. Justice must be done and the only way justice can be done is to reorganise the election so that every Gambian votes. That's the only way we can resolve the matter peacefully and fairly." Striking a defiant tone, he rejected any foreign interference and declared that he was prepared to fight.

On 23 December, ECOWAS announced that they would send in troops if Jammeh failed to step down. The president of the ECOWAS Commission, Marcel Alain de Souza, said "The deadline is January 19 when the mandate of Jammeh ends." The military intervention would be led by Senegal. De Souza said "If he doesn't go, we have a force that is already on alert, and this force will intervene to restore the will of the people." Speaking on 7 January, Johnson Sirleaf emphasized the importance of peaceful resolution, saying that ECOWAS was "committed to a peaceful mediation and a peaceful transfer of power in The Gambia. We will continue to pursue that for now".

== Supreme Court consideration ==
Six additional appointments to the Supreme Court (five—Habeeb A. O. Abiru, Abubakar Datti Yahaya, Abubakar Tijani, Obande Festus and Akomaye Angim—from Nigeria, and one—Nicholas Colin Brown—from Sierra Leone) were reported to have been made in secret, starting in October 2016, with the cooperation of Chief Justice Fagbenle. One of the newly appointed justices, Akomaye Angim, is a former Chief Justice of The Gambia. However, it was not clear whether the new justices had all accepted their appointments – especially in the case of Abiru, who was reported to be planning to reject his appointment and to meet with other appointees who may do the same. Fagbenle said on 21 December that a Supreme Court hearing to consider the APRC's appeal would be held on 10 January 2017, with the newly appointed judges.

On 10 January, the date on which the Supreme Court was scheduled to hear the APRC's appeal of the election results, Chief Justice Emmanuel Fagbenle said the foreign judges that had been appointed to hear the case would only be available in May or November, so the hearing of the case needed to be delayed for several months. Fagbenle said "We can only hear this matter when we have a full bench of the Supreme Court", and officially adjourned the session until 16 January. Onogeme Uduma, a Nigerian who was intended to act as the president of the court, was reported to be unavailable until May. It was also reported that one of Jammeh's top ministers, Sherriff Bojang, had resigned in protest over Jammeh's refusal to accept defeat, although state television reported that Bojang had been sacked.

Fagbenle suggested that mediation would be the best way forward to resolve the impasse. However, Jammeh appeared on state television and declared that he will stay in office "to ensure the rule of law is upheld" until the Supreme Court makes a decision on his appeal, which is not expected until at least May 2017. He slammed the stances of the United Nations, the African Union, and ECOWAS as "foreign interference" in The Gambia's affairs.

Jammeh filed a new request for an injunction to try to prevent Chief Justice Fagbenle from swearing in Barrow as president. However, Fagbenle said he would not consider the new case, saying "Given that the injunction affects me in my capacity as the chief justice, I will recuse myself from hearing it." A lawyer for Jammeh's party conceded that obtaining an injunction to prevent Barrow from being sworn in was not possible at this stage.

== Media crackdown and state of emergency ==
On 1 and 2 January 2017, three private radio stations, Taranga FM, Hilltop Radio, and Afri Radio, were shut down under orders from the National Intelligence Agency. On 3 January, it was reported that Alieu Momar Njai, the head of the electoral commission, had left the country or gone into hiding due to concerns about his safety. In a New Year message, Chief of Defence Staff Ousman Bargie affirmed that Jammeh had "the unflinching loyalty and support of The Gambia Armed Forces".

On 17 January, a day before the end of his presidential mandate, Jammeh announced a 90-day state of emergency. In a televised declaration, Jammeh justified the move by citing "the unprecedented and extraordinary amount of foreign interference" during and preceding the December 2016 vote. Opposition parties accused Jammeh of using the measure to retain the presidency and feared that it could be used to void the election result.

The National Assembly approved the state of emergency along with a resolution denouncing foreign interference and an extension of its own term, due to end in April, by three months (to 11 July 2017). It then approved an extension of Jammeh's term for three months.

== Inauguration of Adama Barrow and ECOWAS intervention ==
Following the announcement of the state of emergency, Senegalese troops were deployed to the Gambian border on 18 January as the spearhead of the ECOWAS military response. These were supported by aircraft and personnel from the Nigerian Air Force, together with a ship from the Nigerian Navy. The same day, Gambian Army Chief Ousman Badjie reportedly said that his forces would not fight in the event of foreign intervention against Jammeh.

Vice President Isatou Njie-Saidy resigned on 18 January. By that point, eight cabinet members had resigned due to the crisis.

The opposition vowed to go ahead with the inauguration at Banjul Mini-Stadium, but this was later cancelled, with Barrow's spokesman Halifa Sallah stating that he would be sworn in at an undisclosed location. It was revealed that he would be sworn in at the Gambia's embassy in Dakar. President of Mauritania Mohamed Ould Abdel Aziz met with Jammeh in an unsuccessful attempt to persuade him to leave office. On 19 January, ECOWAS gave Jammeh a deadline that ended at midnight to step down. Troops from Senegal, Nigeria and other neighboring countries gathered at Gambia's border with Senegal, waiting for an ECOWAS order to enter Gambia. Planes of the Nigerian Air Force were seen flying over the Gambia.

Botswana became the first country to cease recognition of Jammeh on 19 January. On 19 January 2017, Senegalese forces crossed the border and invaded the Gambia.

Adama Barrow was sworn in as President of The Gambia at a ceremony in an embassy of The Gambia in Dakar, Senegal, on 19 January 2017. Hours later, Senegalese Armed Forces entered The Gambia to enforce Barrow's presidency. The United Nations Security Council approved a resolution backing Barrow while calling on Jammeh to step down. It backed ECOWAS' efforts to ensure the results of the 2016 presidential election are respected, but endorsed "political means first", without expressing support for military action. Senegal later halted its offensive in order to mediate the crisis one final time, with the invasion to proceed at noon on 20 January if Jammeh still refused to relinquish power. That night, Jammeh sacked the remainder of his cabinet, according to reports from the Gambia Radio & Television Service, and announced he would replace it with new members.

Jammeh, however, refused to step down even after the noon deadline passed, and while it was subsequently extended to 16:00 GMT, he again refused to resign. Mauritania's President Mohamed Abdul Aziz, President of Guinea Alpha Condé and United Nations' regional chief Mohammed Ibn Chambas tried to persuade him to step down. Gambia's army chief Lieutenant-General Ousman Badjie pledged his allegiance to Barrow and stated that the Gambian Army would not fight ECOWAS. Barrow and a Senegalese official later stated that Jammeh had agreed to step down and would leave the country. Mauritania's President Aziz later announced that a deal had been reached for him to step down and leave the country.

During the early hours on 21 January, Jammeh announced on state television that he was stepping down from the post of president, and he left the country later the same day. The National Assembly revoked the state of emergency imposed by Jammeh on 24 January. Following, 4,000 ECOWAS troops remained in the Gambia to maintain order in preparation for Barrow to return and consolidate his presidency. Five days later, Barrow returned to the Gambia while requesting the ECOWAS troops (now numbering about 2,500) to stay for at least six months to help him firmly establish order.

== See also ==
- 1981 Gambian coup d'état attempt
