= Masaneh Kinteh =

Gambian Army officer

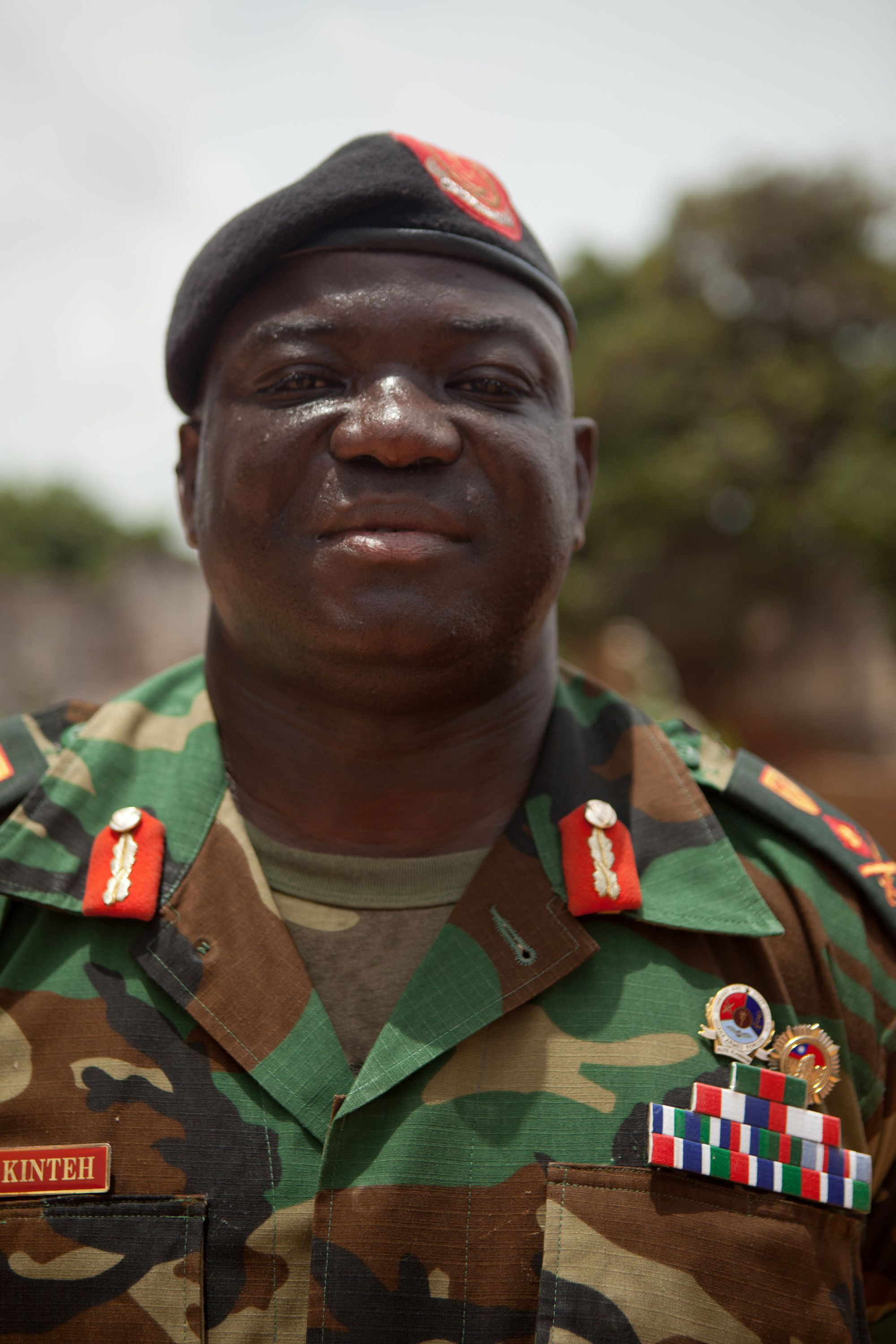
- Kanteh during Exercise African Endeavor, 5 July 2011

Chief of the Defence Staff
- In office 27 February 2017 – 5 March 2020
- President: Adama Barrow
- Preceded by: Ousman Badjie
- Succeeded by: Yankuba Drammeh
- In office 9 October 2009 – 6 July 2012
- President: Yahya Jammeh
- Preceded by: Lang Tombong Tamba
- Succeeded by: Ousman Badjie

Military Aide to the President Prime Minister of the Gambia
- In office 25 January 2017 – 27 February 2017
- President: Adama Barrow
- Preceded by: New position

Personal details
- Born: 13 August 1968 (age 57) Sankwia, Jarra West, the Gambia

Military service
- Allegiance: The Gambia
- Branch/service: Gambian National Army
- Years of service: 1991–2012; 2017–2020
- Rank: Lieutenant General
- Commands: Chief of the Defence Staff

Masaneh Nyuku Kinteh (born 13 August 1968) is a retired Gambian Army officer who served as Chief of the Defence Staff until his removal on 5 March 2020 by President Adama Barrow. He was the Gambian Chief of Mission in Havana, Cuba, from 2012 to 2017, and was previously Chief of the Defence Staff from 2009 to 2012. He was retired with the rank of lieutenant general in 2012, having previously also served as Deputy Chief of the Defence Staff in 2009, and shifted to the Foreign Service. He was reinstated as the Chief of Defence Staff in 2017 but redeployed him to the Foreign Service in 2020, becoming the ambassador to China.

== Early life ==
Kinteh was born in the village of Sankwia, Jarra West, the Gambia. He studied in the United Kingdom and worked as a school teacher from 1988 to 1990.

== Career ==
Kinteh's military career began in November 1990 when he passed the Commission Selection Board organised by the British Army Training Team for the selection of potential officer cadets. He formally joined the Gambian armed forces on 15 March 1991 and gradually rose through the ranks. In December 2004, he became the acting Chief of Staff of the Gambian Army, after the previous incumbent, Assan Sarr, was raised to the position of Chief of the Defence Staff. He was appointed as Deputy Chief of the Defence Staff in 2009 by President Yahya Jammeh.

On 9 October 2009, following Lang Tombong Tamba's sacking (he was later trialled and sentenced to death on charges of treason), Jammeh appointed Kinteh as Chief of the Defence Staff. At the same time, Yankuba Drammeh was raised to Deputy Chief of the Defence Staff, but shortly after was removed from the post. Kinteh was removed as Chief of the Defence Staff by Jammeh on 6 July 2012. The week before he was removed, he was questioned by intelligence officers, but nothing came of their questioning. No official reason was given for his removal, but it was said that he would receive a post in the foreign service. Ousman Badjie was chosen as Kinteh's replacement.

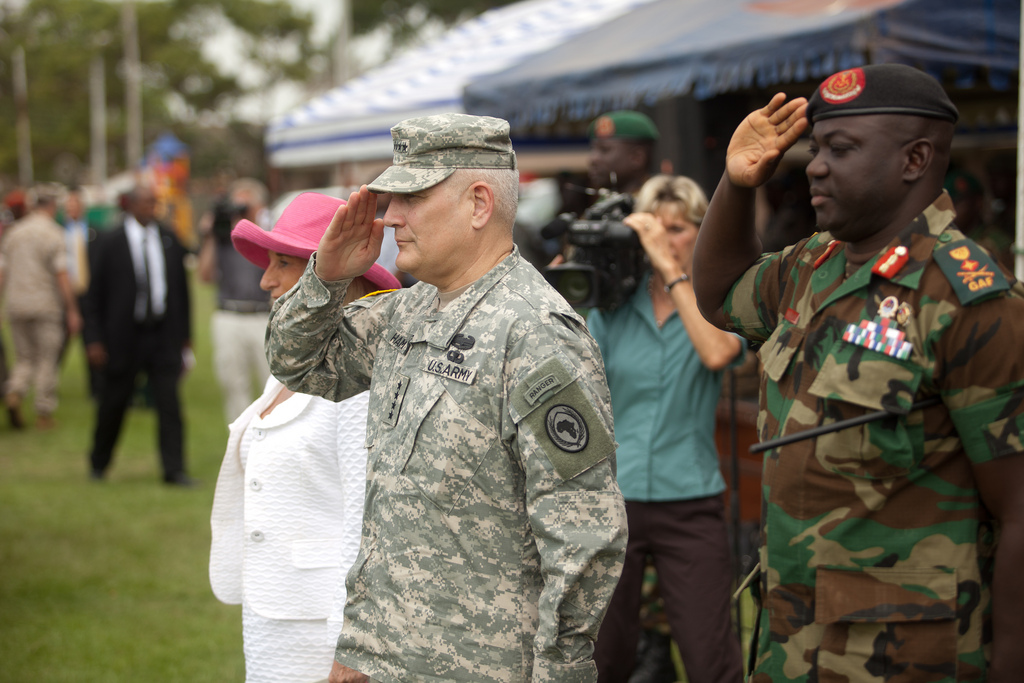
Kinteh and Carter Ham surveying the troops, 21 July 2011.

Following his appointment to the foreign service, there was some confusion over whether he had been appointed as the Gambian ambassador to Tunisia or as chief of mission of the Gambian diplomatic mission in Cuba. The pro-government Daily Observer announced on 2 August 2012 that he had been appointed as the deputy chief of mission in Cuba. He later became the chief of mission in Cuba. In December 2016, during the constitutional crisis, Kinteh was one of 11 Gambian ambassadors to call for Jammeh to step down as President and recognise Adama Barrow as his successor. Jammeh removed Kinteh from his post in Cuba on 10 January 2017.

On 25 January, it was announced that Kinteh would serve as President Barrow's military aide. On 27 February 2017, Kinteh was appointed by Barrow to replace Badjie as Chief of the Defence Staff. He said that Barrow has plans to reform and restructure the military, but his immediate priority was to restore the morale of the troops. He said, "I want to make sure we get over that hurdle and make sure soldiers come out of their self and see themselves as citizens of this country who are to be respected, admired and be role models."

Kinteh was replaced in March 2020 with Drammeh and redeployed to the Foreign Service. He assumed the post of the ambassador of the Gambia to China in September 2020.
