= Yakuba =

Yakuba may refer to:

== People ==
- Yakuba Ouattara (born 1992), Ghanaian-French basketball player
- Denis Yakuba (born 1996), Russian footballer
- Roman Yakuba (born 2001), Ukrainian footballer

== Other uses ==
- Drosophila yakuba, African species
- Ploshcha Yakuba Kolasa (Minsk Metro), metro station in Belarus

== See also ==
- Yacouba
- Yankuba
- Yakubu
