= Yankuba Drammeh =

Gambian military officer

Lieutenant General Yankuba Drammeh

Chief of the Defence Staff
- Incumbent
- Assumed office 5 March 2020
- President: Adama Barrow
- Preceded by: Lt-Gen. Masaneh Kinteh

Military service
- Allegiance: The Gambia
- Branch/service: Gambian National Army
- Rank: Lieutenant general
- Commands: Chief of the Defence Staff; Deputy Chief of the Defence Staff

Lieutenant General Yankuba Drammeh is a Gambian military officer who is the current Chief of the Defence Staff of the Gambia.

== Military career ==
At the time of the 1994 coup d'état, executed by Yahya Jammeh, Drammeh was a Second Lieutenant in the Gambian Army. Like many other officers not involved in the coup, he was detained in the Mile II Central Prison but later released and restored to his previous role.

Drammeh was a brigadier general and Deputy Chief of the Defence Staff prior to his dismissal from the army by Yahya Jammeh on 30 November 2009. He was arrested and detained while links to Lang Tombong Tamba's alleged attempted coup were explored. He was cleared of any wrongdoing and was re-instated on 2 December 2009 as a major general in his previous role. In February 2010, he was reassigned from the military to the diplomatic service, first as Deputy Ambassador to Turkey and then as Consul-General in New York.

On 29 June 2015, Drammeh was again reinstated as a Major General and Deputy Chief of the Defence Staff, filling a role that had been left vacant since the dismissal of Saikou Seckan in 2013. During the 2016 presidential election campaign, an editorial in The Gambia Echo noted the closeness of Drammeh to Jammeh's campaign, asking why critics were "totally oblivious to General Drammeh’s close proximity" to Jammeh. In March 2020, he was appointed as the CDS.
