= Yacoob =

Yacoob is a masculine given name and surname, a form of Jacob. It may either be a South African form of Jacob or a variant of Arabic Yakub. Notable people with the name include:

- Zak Yacoob (born 1948), South African judge
- Yacoob Omar (born 1948), South African cricketer

== See also ==
- Yacouba (name), a West African form of Jacob
- Yakhouba, another West African form of Jacob
