= Sanneh =

Sanneh may refer to:

- Amadou Sanneh, Gambian politician and accountant
- Bubacarr Sanneh, Gambian footballer
- Kebba T. Sanneh, Gambian politician
- Kelefa Sanneh, English-American journalist
- Lamin Sanneh, theologian and historian
- Ramatoulie DK Sanneh, Gambian army general
- Suwaibou Sanneh, Gambian sprinter
- Tony Sanneh, American soccer player
