= Yankuba =

Yankuba is a given name. People with this name include:

- Yankuba Badjie, former Director-General of the Gambian National Intelligence Agency
- Yankuba Ceesay, Gambian former football coach and player
- Yankuba Drammeh, Gambian military officer
- Yankuba Jarju, Gambian professional footballer
- Yankuba Minteh, Gambian professional footballer
- Yankuba Sonko, Gambian police officer
