= Yakhouba =

Yakhouba is a West African masculine given name, a form of Jacob. Notable people with the given name include:

- Yakhouba Gnagna Barry (born 1998), Guinean footballer
- Yakhouba Diawara (born 1982), French basketball player

== See also ==
- Yacouba (name), a more common West African form of Jacob
- Yacoob, a South African form of Jacob
