= Gambia Socialist Revolutionary Party =

- Leader: Gibril L George
- Founded: 1980
- Banned: October 1980
- Ideology: Communism; Marxism–Leninism; Pan-Africanism

The Gambia Socialist Revolutionary Party (GSRP) was a Marxist-Leninist party in the Gambia, most notable for leading a failed insurrection against the government of Dawda Jawara in 1981.

== Origins and ban ==
The GSRP was formed in early 1980 by Gibril L. George and was subsequently banned by the government in October of the same year. The party adopted the name of the Gambia Underground Socialist Revolutionary Workers Party (GUSRWP). At this time, Kukoi Sanyang, a Gambian socialist, returned to the Gambia and became active in the party.

== 1981 coup d'état ==
On 30 July 1981 the party, along with disaffected members of the Gambia Field Force launched an unsuccessful coup against the government. The insurrection was quickly defeated following military intervention by Senegal; Gibril George was killed, Kukoi Sanyang fled to Guinea-Bissau and the party was effectively dissolved.
