= Katmerciler Hızır =

Turkish MRAPs

Hızır / Ateş
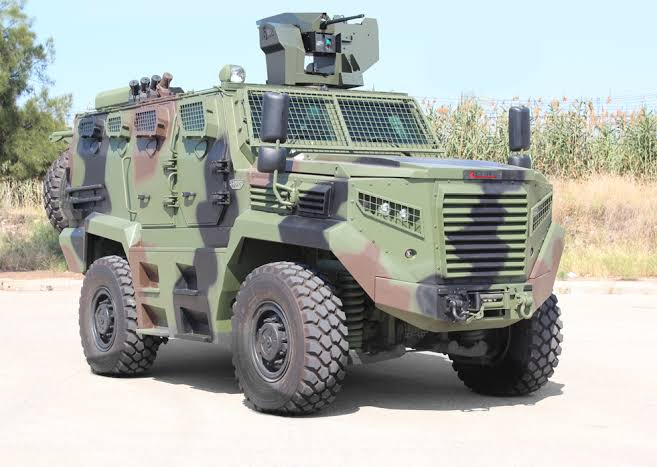
- Place of origin: Turkey

Service history
- Used by: Turkish Armed Forces

Production history
- Designer: Katmerciler; Aselsan
- Manufacturer: Katmerciler

Specifications
- Mass: 16.000 kg (both versions)
- Length: 5570 mm (Hızır), 6000 mm (Ateş)
- Width: 2490 mm (Hızır), 2500 mm (Ateş)
- Height: 2610 mm (Hızır), 2600 mm (Ateş)
- Crew: 2 (commander, driver)
- Passengers: 7 (Hızır), 4 (Ateş)
- Armor: STANAG 4569 Level 2
- Main armament: (optional) 7.62 mm caliber medium machine gun, or 12.7mm caliber heavy machine gun or 40 mm caliber grenade launcher (all operated from inside the vehicle through a remote-controlled system designed by Aselsan)
- Engine: Cummins ISL 8.9-liter, inline-six cylinder, turbocharged, intercooled diesel 400 PS (298 kW) @ 2100 rpm
- Transmission: six-speed, fully automatic Allison 3000 Series
- Suspension: fully independent with coil springs and shock absorbers
- Ground clearance: 410 mm
- Operational range: 700 km (435 miles) at cruising speed
- Maximum speed: 120 km/h
- Steering system: power-assisted, front axle

The Katmerciler Hızır (Turkish pronunciation: [kʰatˈmeɾˈdʒiːˈleɾ hɯzɯɾ]) is a family of MRAP (Mine Resistant Ambush Protected) armoured personnel carriers designed and produced by Turkish company Katmerciler. Hızır is capable of carrying up to nine personnel and its various modifications can perform a wide variety of tasks, such as military personnel transportation, medical evacuation, engaging in armed combat, serving as a mobile command and control center or weapons carrier platform, conducting military reconnaissance and border patrol missions or providing CBRN defence. The name Hızır is the Turkish variant of Khidr, a mystical Islamic figure described in the Quran as a guardian that aids those in distress.

== Variants ==
The Ateş (Turkish pronunciation: [aˈteʃ]; lit. "Flame"), Hızır's border patrol and reconnaissance variant, operated by Turkish Land Forces, is a Hızır 4x4 vehicle integrated with Aselsan's high-tech reconnaissance, surveillance systems and environmental monitoring radar. The Ateş variant was designed to meet border security requirements set up by the European Union-funded project to "Supply Mobile Surveillance Units for Increasing Border Surveillance Capacity of Borders between Turkey and EU", which contributed 27.6 million euros, or 75% of the project's cost. Ateş can carry out reconnaissance and surveillance missions in day and night conditions with a range of 40 km. It can carry up to six personnel, two of which are crew (driver and commander).

The Hızır II (or Hızır 2) was unveiled at the İDEF defence expo in August 2021. It features a redesigned exterior, two side doors instead of Hızır I's four-door design, increased crew capacity (up to fourteen occupants compared to nine in Hızır I) due to new face-to-face seating configuration in the passenger compartment, rear ramp in place of previous model's swing door, larger fuel tank, extended operational range and improved air conditioning system.

== Operators ==
- Turkey: 57 Hızır 4x4 Ateş border patrol variants operated by Turkish Land Forces
- Uruguay: 1 Hızır 4x4 Ateş procured in October 2021 to be used by the Uruguay Mechanized Infantry Unit under the United Nations Disengagement Observer Force mission.
- Gambia: 20 Hızır 4x4 MRAPs ordered to be operated by Gambia Armed Forces. Deliveries began in October 2022, with first few examples already accepted into service. Besides the 20 purchased vehicles the Turkish government donated 2 additional Hızır MRAPs to the Gambian Armed Forces in November 2022.
- Rwanda: Both Hızır MRAP and Ateş border patrol variants on order to be operated by Rwanda Defence Force.
- Senegal: Hızır II variant in use, deliveries started in 2024.

=== Potential User ===
- Uganda: While the sale was never officially announced, at least 15 such vehicles are rumored to be in possession of Uganda People's Defence Force after the company released a statement about exporting MRAPs to an unnamed "African customer" in July 2019 along with a photo of 15 Hızırs being loaded onto a ship, later followed by video emerging of at least a dozen Hızır 4x4 vehicles driving through the streets of Uganda in early 2021.

== Future operator ==
- Kenya: 118 Hızır 4x4 MRAPs ordered to be operated by Kenya Defence Forces.
