= Lang Tombong Tamba =

Former Chief of the Defense Staff of the Gambian Armed Forces

Lang Tombong Tamba (born c. 1965) was the Chief of the Defense Staff of the Gambian Armed Forces until his arrest, detention and trial in an attempted coup.

== Early life and education ==
A Jola, Tamba was born in Sintet, Foni Jarrol and probably lived in Casamance as a child, before attending Nusrat High School.

== Military career ==
He joined the Gambian National Army (GNA) as a recruit in October 1986. At the time of Yahya Jammeh coup in 1994, he was a Lieutenant and the third in command of the presidential guard unit of President Dawda Jawara. During the coup, he sought to prevent a clash between the coup makers and the presidential guards, and although Jammeh ordered his arrest, the decision was almost immediately reversed.

After the coup, he remained in the GNA, becoming commander of State House Guards when a captain around 2000 and being responsible for the personal security of the Gambian president, Yahya Jammeh. He became a Lieutenant General in 2005 when he was appointed chief of staff of the Gambian Armed Forces (GAF) and later as Deputy Chief of Defense Staff in November 2005 as a colonel.

When the incumbent Chief of Defense Staff, Ndure Cham carried out an attempted coup on 21 March 2006, he was widely credited at the time with foiling Cham's attempt. He was appointed as the Chief of Defense Staff on 22 March 2006, Defense Headquarters with duties to oversee the Army, the Navy and the National Guard. He was promoted to the rank of brigadier general in May 2007, major general and then to lieutenant general in July 2009, becoming the first Gambian soldier to hold this title.

== Arrest ==
He was seen as a key Jammeh loyalist until his dismissal on 9 October 2009 and was replaced by general Masaneh Kinteh. He was apparently informed that he would instead be appointed as Gambian ambassador to Taiwan, but in fact, in November 2009, he was arrested at his home by armed soldiers. In March 2010, he was put on trial along with eight others (including three civilians) for conspiring to overthrow the Yahya Jammeh in 2009. All eight were convicted in July 2010 and seven were sentenced to death. He denied the charges, insisting on his innocence, and absolute commitment to President Jammeh's government. Their appeal was dismissed by the Court of Appeal in April 2011 and the Supreme Court in October 2012, but reduced to long-term imprisonment by the Supreme Court in November 2014.

He was subsequently charged with Rear Admiral Sarjo Fofana, former Chief of Naval Staff (who has presided over the military tribunal that prosecuted the army officers accused of involvement in Ndure Cham coup) with treason. They were accused of knowingly withholding information about the planned coup and was sentenced to long-term imprisonment in May 2011. He was released from detention after being one of 234 prisoners pardoned by Yahya Jammeh on 23 July 2015.
