= Polygamy in the Gambia =

Polygamous unions are legally recognized in the Gambia and have been said to be very prevalent. They are frequently considered by the older generations of Gambian men as an indicator of prosperity.

In 1795, Mungo Park observed that "every man of free condition has a plurality of wives". He noted that it is necessary for each wife to be accommodated in their own hut.

Adama Barrow, the current president of the Gambia, has two wives. His predecessor, Yahya Jammeh, had two wives at one point in time, but divorced his third wife under pressure from his second wife (whom he had married after divorcing his first wife).
