= Military ranks of the Gambia =

The Military ranks of The Gambia are the military insignia used by the Gambia Armed Forces.

The Gambian rank insignia is strongly influenced by its heritage as a part of the Commonwealth of Nations.

== Commissioned officer ranks ==
The rank insignia of commissioned officers.

Rank group	General / flag officers				Senior officers			Junior officers
Gambian National Army
Gambian National Army	General	Lieutenant general	Major general	Brigadier general	Colonel	Lieutenant colonel	Major	Captain	First lieutenant	Second lieutenant
Gambian Navy
Gambian Navy		Vice admiral	Rear admiral	Commodore	Captain	Commander	Lieutenant commander	Lieutenant	Lieutenant (junior grade)	Sub-lieutenant
Rank group	General / flag officers				Senior officers			Junior officers

== Other ranks ==
The rank insignia of non-commissioned officers and enlisted personnel.

Rank group	Senior NCOs				Junior NCOs		Enlisted
Gambian National Army							No insignia
Gambian National Army	Warrant officer class 1	Warrant officer class 2	Staff sergeant	Sergeant	Corporal	Lance corporal	Private (or equivalent)
Gambian Navy
Rank group	Senior NCOs				Junior NCOs		Enlisted
