= Muslim Senior Secondary School =

- Banjul; The Gambia

Information
- Type: Secondary school
- Religious affiliation(s): Islam

Muslim Senior Secondary School is a school in Banjul, the Gambia. It was formerly known as the Muslim High School. Its alumni include Adama Barrow, the 3rd President of the Gambia.

== History ==
The Gambia Muslim Association (GMA), under the leadership of medical doctor and diplomat Ebrahim M. Samba (he later was appointed Honorary Life Chairman of the Board of Governors) saw the need for a school for Muslim youths in the Gambia who could not gain admission to the then-missionary schools. Originally, in 1966, they began a madrasa hosted at the Muhammadan Primary School, Banjul. However, in 1975, the Muslim High School was founded.

In 1995, the name was changed to the Muslim Senior Secondary School, as required by a new education policy brought in by the Armed Forces Provisional Ruling Council. Alhagie Sheikh Adama Joof served as the school's first principal. The school is currently located in an area of Banjul called Half-Die, in close proximity to the Banjul Dockyards. It is a government grant-aided school and is overseen by a Board of Governors. It is co-educational and provides an English 'section' to grades 10, 11 and 12, and an Arabic 'section' from grades 1 to 12. The school's current principal is Lamin K. Marong, who in 2009 was also elected as President of the Gambia Teachers' Union (GTU). Muslim senior secondary school is moved from the Capital city Banjul to Bursibi turn table.https://118finder.gm/biz/gambia-muslim-senior-secondary-school/

== Alumni ==
- Adama Barrow, 3rd President of the Gambia
- Lamin Kaba Bajo, former politician and President of the Gambia Football Federation
- Sheikh Omar Faye, former Gambian Ambassador to the United States (tutor at the school from 1981 to 1983)
