= Ousman Badjie =

Gambian Chief of the Defence Staff

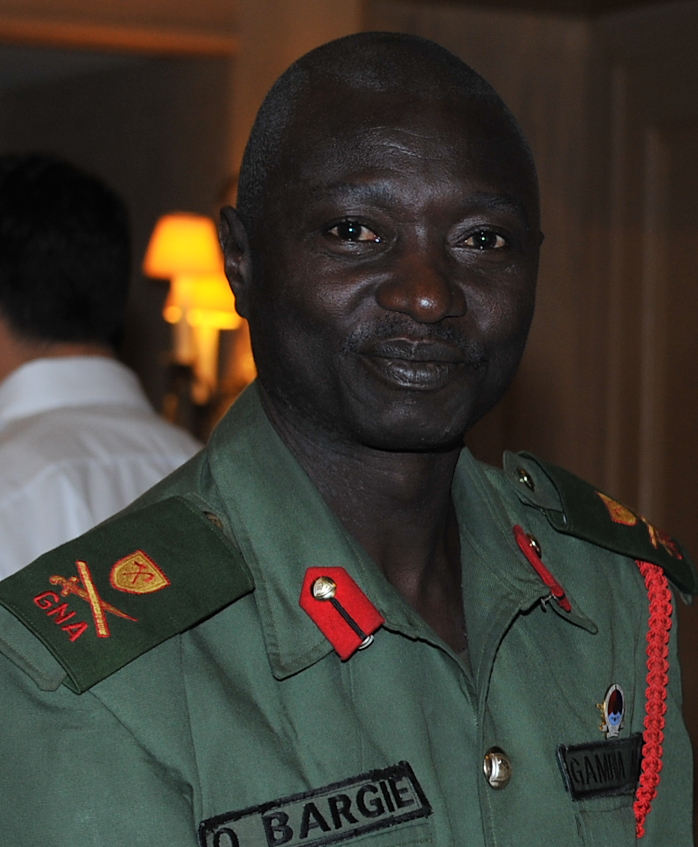
- Military career
- Allegiance: The Gambia
- Branch: Gambian National Army
- Rank: Lieutenant General
- Commands: Chief of the Defence Staff

Ousman Badjie (born 15 November 1967) was the chief of the Defence Staff of the Gambia, and lieutenant-general in the Gambian Army, having succeeded Masaneh Kinteh to the position. He was removed from his position in March 2017.

Badjie received attention during the 2016–2017 Gambian constitutional crisis for his alleged support of Adama Barrow in December, then supporting Yahya Jammeh in January, though later saying that his troops will not fight for Jammeh against ECOWAS forces.
