= Yankuba Badjie =

Gambian government official

Yankuba Badjie was Director-General of the National Intelligence Agency under former President Yahya Jammeh from December 2013 to 2016.

== History ==
He was born in New Jeshwang in Kanifing (Gambia). His father, Arabou Badjie, is ethnically Jola, while his mother, Binta Daffeh, is a Mandinka from Brikama Kabadaa.

He went to Kandiba Primary School in New Jeshwang and failed his Common Entrance Exam before proceeding to Crab Island Secondary School in the capital, Banjul. After his second year at Crab Island, he transferred to an Islamic school. After completing high school, he briefly worked in The Gambia before he relocated to the United States as an economic migrant alongside his brother Yusupha Badjie.

While in the United States, he lived in Seattle, where he worked in home healthcare, and Ohio, where he worked as a laborer in a warehouse before returning to the Gambia. Due to his father's connections to Yahya Jammeh, he was able to join the intelligence service. He became Deputy Director General for Operations before being promoted to lead the NIA as Director-General in 2013.

In April 2016, Yankuba Badjie was personally involved in giving orders for the torture of protesters and the subsequent killings of the United Democratic Party's Organizing Secretary and deputy regional Chairman, Solo Sanderg, and Solo Krumah. He was also responsible for the disappearances of Alhagie Ceesay and Ebou Jobe, two Gambian-Americans who went missing while on vacation in The Gambia.

Following the Gambian presidential election 2016, which toppled long-time dictator Jammeh, he was arrested in February 2017. He was later charged with the murder of Solo Sandeng. In December 2017, he became subject to sanctions by the United States.
