= Kukoi Sanyang =

Gambian revolutionary (1952–2013)

Kukoi Samba Sanyang
- Born: 1952; Wassadu, Foni Jarrol, The Gambia
- Died: 18 June 2013 (aged 60–61)
- Occupation: Politician
- Political party: Gambia Socialist Revolutionary Party

Kukoi Samba Sanyang (1952 – 18 June 2013) was a Gambian politician and leader of the unsuccessful 1981 coup d'état against the government of Dawda Jawara.

== Early years ==
Sanyang was born in the village of Wassadu in the district of Foni Jarrol.

== Role in the 1981 coup d'état ==
On 31 July 1981, while Jawara was abroad, a 12-member National Revolutionary Council (NRC) headed by Sanyang seized control of the country. The leftist NRC accused Jawara's government of being "corrupt, tribalistic, and despotic". They also announced the suspension of the country's constitution and proclaimed their intention to establish a "dictatorship of the proletariat".

The attempted coup ended on 5 August when Senegalese troops defeated the rebel forces. Sanyang took refuge in Libya, which had also given him some backing for the coup attempt.

== Role in Liberia ==
Charles Taylor visited Libya several times, probably between 1986 and 1989. He met with Sanyang and other Gambians who had participated in the 1981 coup attempt. In 1989 “Dr. Manning” was listed by the NPFL as Taylor's vice-president, but was soon edged out by Taylor and retired to manage a bar in Ouagadougou.

In 1995 the Farafenni army camp was attacked by half a dozen men who killed some Gambian soldiers and held the camp for several hours. Some of the attackers, later captured, claimed they were Sanyang's collaborators. They have been condemned to death and are awaiting their execution. Another was arrested in 2003, being held in Banjul and still on trial by early 2007. In 2003 Sanyang based himself in Senegal and went several times to The Gambia to talk with Gambian President Yahya Jammeh at his Kanilai residence. In August 2003 the negotiations failed and Sanyang returned to Senegal for permanent residence.

In early June 2006, shortly before the Gambian presidential elections, he was along with some of his men put in detention “at the house of a military officer in Bissau" during a visit to that country. He was detained at the Masuang Military Camp "in maximum military detention” on 12 May 2007. On January 30, some military officers in Bissau blocked their own government in its attempts to hand Kukoi Sanyang over to the authorities in Banjul. That government has spent close to three million US dollars in its attempts at extradition, wanting to arrange for Sanyang's repatriation to Banjul against Casamance hard-line rebel leader being handed over to Senegal. It has been suggested that Sanyang may have been preparing an attack on Yahya Jammeh prior to the elections, and then seize power.

Sanyang, Sheriffba Jobe and Mohammed Sowe escaped on May 11. Their pickup was organized by the UNHCR (United Nations High Commissioner for Refugees) office who were alerted to their presence in Bissau's Justice ministry, while the Justice Minister was arguing with the Army Chief's services and refusing the impromptu transfer of the trio to his jurisdiction. Both Jobe and Sowe were accorded refugee status prior to their arrest, and are now under UN jurisdiction.

== Death ==
Sanyang died in Mali in 2013.

== See also ==
- Mustapha Danso
