= Adama Barrow =

President of the Gambia since 2017

His Excellency Adama Barrow
- 𞤀𞥄𞤣𞤢𞤥𞤢 𞤄𞤢𞥄𞤪𞤮
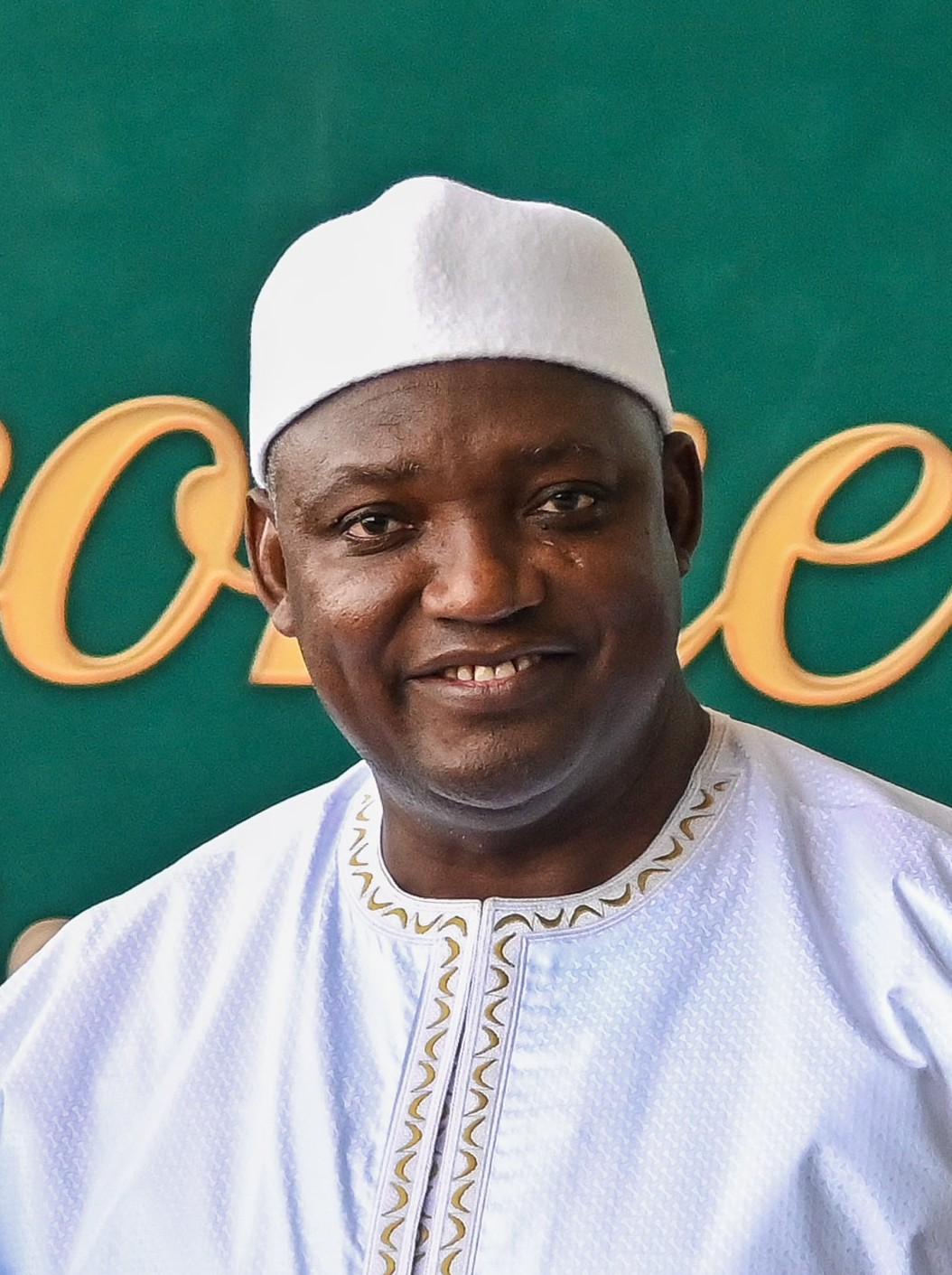
- Barrow in 2024

3rd President of the Gambia
- Incumbent
- Assumed office 19 January 2017 (Note: Barrow was inaugurated on 19 January 2017 at the Gambian embassy in Senegal, but Yahya Jammeh did not relinquish his position until 21 January. Barrow returned to Gambia on 26 January and took the oath of office a second time on 18 February.)
- Vice President: See list: Fatoumata Tambajang (2017–2018) Ousainou Darboe (2018–2019) Isatou Touray (2019–2022) Badara Joof (2022–2023) Vacant (Jan–Feb 2023) Muhammad B.S. Jallow (2023–present)
- Preceded by: Yahya Jammeh

President of the National People's Party
- Incumbent
- Assumed office 31 December 2019
- Preceded by: Party established

Personal details
- Born: 15 February 1965 (age 61) Mankamang Kunda, British Gambia
- Party: NPP (2019–present)
- Other political affiliations: Independent (2016–2019); Coalition 2016 (2016–2019); UDP (2007–2016); NRP (2006–2007)
- Spouse(s): Fatoumatta Bah (m. 1997); Sarjo Mballow
- Children: 5 (including 1 deceased)

Adama Barrow (Fula: 𞤀𞥄𞤣𞤢𞤥𞤢 𞤄𞤢𞥄𞤪𞤮, romanized: Aadama Baaro, born 15 February 1965) is a Gambian politician and real estate developer who has served as third president of the Gambia since 2017. A member of the National People's Party (NPP), he has served as the party's president since its creation in 2019.

Born in Mankamang Kunda, a village in Jimara district, Barrow attended Crab Island Secondary School and the Muslim High School, the latter on a scholarship. He then worked for Alhagie Musa Njie & Sons, a Gambian energy company, where he became a sales manager. Moving to London in the early 2000s, Barrow studied for qualifications in real estate. After returning to the Gambia in 2006, he founded Majum Real Estate and was the CEO until 2016. He became the treasurer of the United Democratic Party, an opposition party, and then became party leader in September 2016 after the previous leader was jailed.

Barrow was then chosen as the UDP candidate in the 2016 presidential election. It was later announced that he would stand as an independent with the backing of the opposition group Coalition 2016 (a coalition supported by the UDP and six other parties). Barrow subsequently won the presidential election with 43.34% of the vote, defeating long-time incumbent Yahya Jammeh. Jammeh initially accepted the result, but later reneged on this, and Barrow was forced to flee to neighbouring Senegal, triggering a constitutional crisis. He was inaugurated at the Gambian embassy in Senegal on 19 January 2017, and Jammeh was forced to leave the Gambia after military intervention from ECOWAS, and go into exile on 21 January. Barrow returned to The Gambia on 26 January and was sworn in for a second time on 18 February.

In November 2021, Adama Barrow announced his candidacy for the 2021 presidential election, and was re-elected.

== Early life, education and career ==
Barrow was born on 15 February 1965 in Mankamang Kunda, a small village near in Jimara district, three days before the Gambia achieved independence from the United Kingdom. He is the son of Mamudu Barrow and Kaddijatou Jallow. His father was a Mandinka, and his mother came from the Fula tribe. He attended the local Koba Kunda primary school, and then Crab Island Secondary School in Banjul. He then received a scholarship to study at the Muslim High School. After leaving school, he worked for Alhagie Musa Njie & Sons, a Gambian energy company, and rose through the ranks to become a sales manager. In the early 2000s, he moved to London where he studied for qualifications in real estate. Concurrently, he worked as a security supervisor at a local Argos store in order to finance his studies. He later described these experiences as formative, saying "Life is a process, and the UK helped me to become the person I am today. Working 15 hours a day builds a man."

Barrow returned to the Gambia and in 2006, he established Majum Real Estate, and from 2006 to 2016 was the chief executive officer (CEO) of the company. On 12 June 2019, he received The Great Builder Super Prize award which is The Africa Road Builders Babacar Ndiaye Trophy. This was for his leadership in building the Senegambia Bridge. Barrow started his political career with the National Reconciliation Party (NRP) headed by his current Minister of Tourism and Culture, Hamat Bah together with the current Gambia Democratic Congress (GDC) leader, Mamma Kandeh. However, in 2007, he parted ways with the NRP and joined the UDP when Bah advised him not to contest against their former colleague Mamma Kandeh who had cross-carpeted to the ruling APRC. Barrow lost the election to Kandeh and maintained a low profile until his election as President of the Gambia in 2016.

== Early political career ==
Barrow began his political involvement in the 2007 Gambian parliamentary election.He contested the Jimara constituency seat under the United Democratic Party (UDP) ticket. He faced the incumbent candidate Mamma Kandeh who was running under the then-ruling Alliance for Patriotic Reorientation and Construction (APRC) ticket. Barrow lost the election to Kandeh. He secured 2,835 votes against Kandeh's 4,067 votes.

== Presidential campaign ==
=== 2016 Gambian presidential election ===
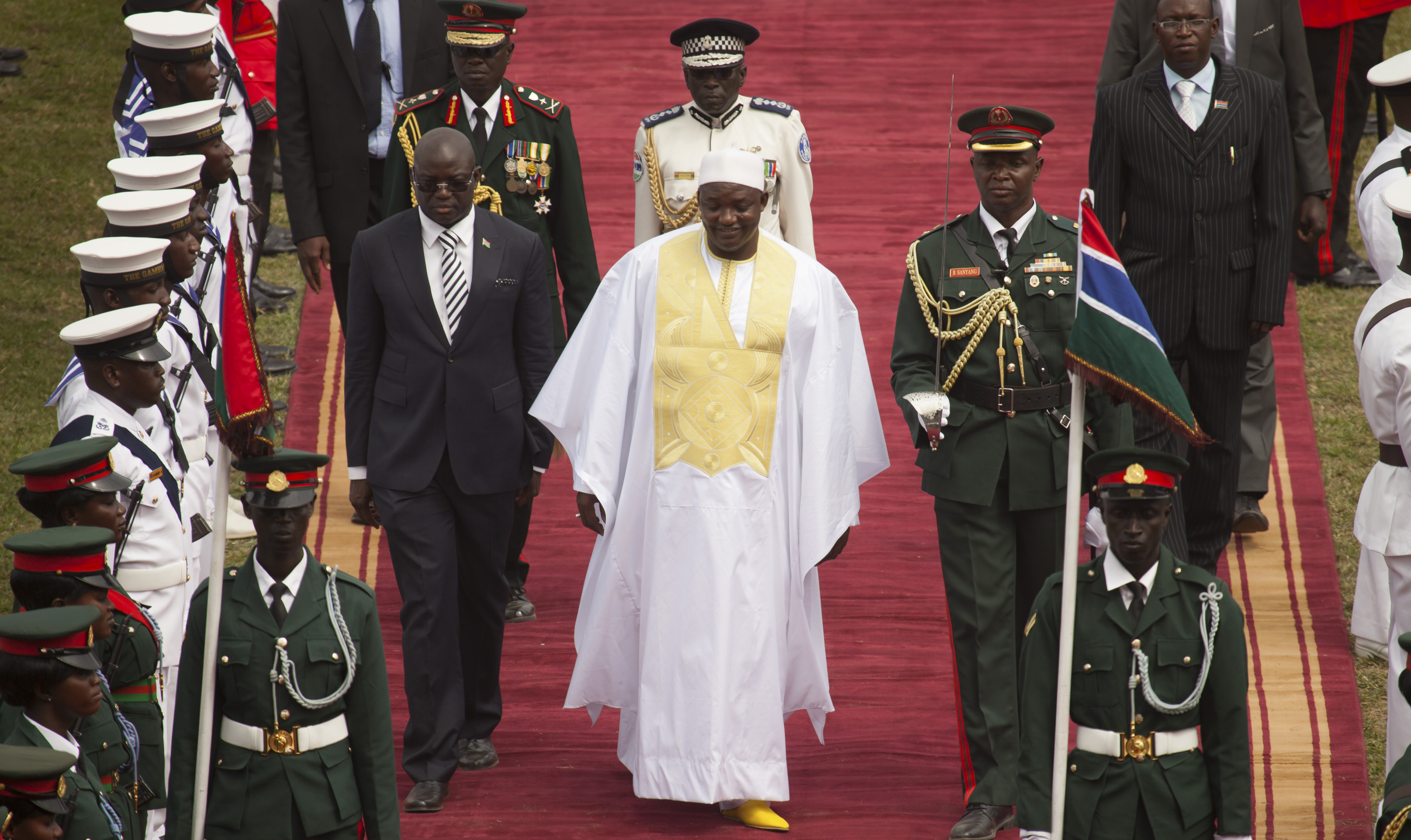
Presidential inauguration (2017)

On 30 October 2016, Barrow was chosen by a coalition of seven opposition parties as their endorsed candidate for the 2016 Gambian presidential election. Prior to becoming a candidate for the presidency, Barrow had not previously held any elected office, but he had been the treasurer of the United Democratic Party (UDP). He resigned from the UDP on 3 November in order to contest the election as an independent, with the full backing of Coalition 2016.

During the campaign, he promised to return the Gambia to its membership of the Commonwealth of Nations and the jurisdiction of the International Criminal Court. He also promised to reform security forces, pledging to increase professionalism and separate them from politics. He also said that he would set up a temporary transition government formed of members from the opposition coalition and would step down within three years.

In the election, Barrow won with 43.34% of the vote, defeating Yahya Jammeh (who received 39.6%) and third-party candidate Mama Kandeh (who received 17.1%).

=== Presidential transition and inauguration ===
Initially, Jammeh indicated that a smooth handover of power would take place. However, on Friday 9 December, in a television broadcast, he declared that he "totally" rejected the result of the election. This was met with both national and international outcry. The UN Security Council called on Jammeh to "respect the choice of the sovereign people of The Gambia" and the African Union declared Jammeh's statement "null and void"; Jammeh's refusal to step down was criticised by the United States, neighbouring Senegal, ECOWAS, and others. Fearing for his safety, Barrow left the Gambia to Senegal while urging Jammeh to step down. Jammeh appealed his loss in the election to the Supreme Court. When the Chief Justice of the Supreme Court declared that the court would not be able consider the case for at least four more months, Jammeh declared a state of emergency to try prevent Barrow from being sworn in as president.

Barrow was then sworn in as President of the Gambia at the Gambian embassy in Dakar, Senegal, on 19 January 2017. On the same day, military forces from Senegal, Nigeria and Ghana entered the Gambia in an ECOWAS military intervention involving land, sea, and air forces to compel Jammeh to leave. The military forces of the Gambia did not oppose the intervention, which only met with isolated minor clashes near Jammeh's hometown of Kanilai. ECOWAS halted the incursion after only a few hours and gave Jammeh his last chance to step down. On 21 January, Jammeh left the Gambia for an ECOWAS-arranged exile, paving the way for the transition of power.

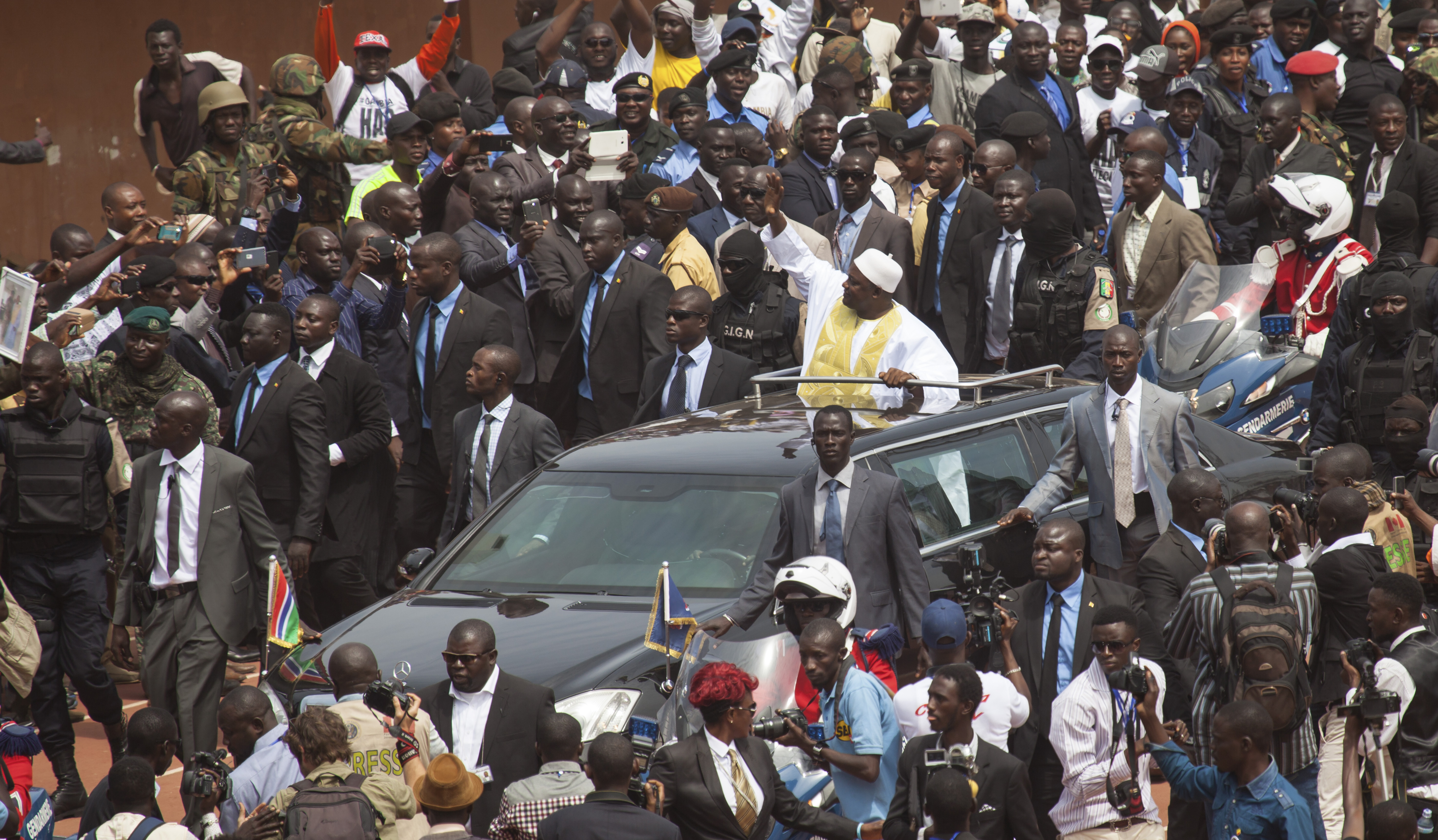
Presidential inauguration (2017)

On 26 January, Barrow returned to the Gambia, while about 2,500 ECOWAS troops remained there to stabilise the country. Barrow asked for the ECOWAS troops to stay for six months. A crowd in the hundreds were waiting at Banjul International Airport to welcome him home. Barrow was also greeted by military officials and members of the coalition government.

On 18 February 2017, Barrow took the oath of office a second time, within the Gambia, at an inauguration ceremony held at Independence Stadium in Bakau outside the capital Banjul.

== Presidency ==
=== Cabinet formation and executive appointments ===
On 28 January 2017, Barrow announced that his cabinet choices would have to declare their assets before taking up their posts. 10 of the 18 ministers were sworn in on 1 February, at a ceremony at Kairaba Beach Hotel, Barrow's temporary residence. Among the appointments, the critical roles of Minister of Foreign Affairs and Minister of Finance and Economic Affairs were filled by Ousainou Darboe and Amadou Sanneh, respectively. The Gambia's first female presidential candidate Isatou Touray was appointed as Minister of Trade, Regional Integration and Employment, and former exile Mai Ahmed Fatty was appointed as Minister of the Interior. Ba Tambadou was appointed as Minister of Justice and Attorney General but was not present to be sworn in.

The Point noted the absence of any members of coalition party PDOIS, contrary to the coalition agreement, and it was announced that further appointments would be technocrats, not politicians. Also, Amie Bojang Sissoho, a feminist activist, was appointed as Director of Press and Public Relations for the Office of the President.

=== Domestic policy ===
==== Human rights and other reforms ====
On 28 January 2017, Barrow announced that the official long-form name of the Gambia would be reverted from Islamic Republic of The Gambia to Republic of The Gambia, reverting a change made by Jammeh in 2015. He also said that he would ensure freedom of the press in the country. On 14 February, Gambia began the process of returning to its membership of the Commonwealth of Nations.

In his inaugural address on 18 February 2017, Barrow announced that he had ordered the release of all people detained without trial under the repressive regime of Yahya Jammeh. A total of 171 prisoners held in Gambia's infamous Mile 2 Prison were set free. Barrow pledged to have the Gambia end human rights violations and cancelled the pending withdrawal of the Gambia from the Rome Statute of the International Criminal Court. On 23 March, Justice Minister Ba Tambadou announced that a Truth, Reconciliation and Reparations Commission would offer reparations to victims of former President Yahya Jammeh's government.

Barrow dismissed General Ousman Badjie, the Chief of the Defence Staff, along with 10 other senior staffers in February 2017. Badjie was replaced by former chief of staff Masaneh Kinteh. David Colley, the director of the prison system, was also dismissed and arrested along with 9 men suspected of being members of Jungulars, an alleged death squad under Yahya Jammeh.

On 21 September 2017, a few hours after his maiden speech at the UN General Assembly, Barrow signed a treaty abolishing the death penalty as part of the Second Optional Protocol to the International Covenant on Civil and Political Rights. He also signed the International Convention on the Protection of the Rights of All Migrant Workers and Members of Their Families, the International Convention for the Protection of All Persons from Enforced Disappearance, the United Nations Convention on Transparency in Treaty-Based Investor-State Arbitration and the Treaty on the Prohibition of Nuclear Weapons.

==== National Intelligence Agency reform ====
On 28 January 2017, Barrow announced that he would rename and restructure the country's intelligence agency, the National Intelligence Agency, pointing out its association with the oppressive regime of Yahya Jammeh. He said the NIA was "an institution that has to continue", but added "the rule of the law, that will be the order of the day". He said that additional training would be given to NIA operatives. On 31 January, Barrow announced that the NIA would be called the State Intelligence Services (SIS). The next day, he fired the NIA Director General, Yankuba Badjie, and replaced him with former NIA Deputy Director Musa Dibba. Barrow also stripped the NIA of its law enforcement functions and temporarily occupied all NIA detention centres with police officers. As part of Barrow's reforms, former head of NIA Yankuba Badjie and director of operations Sheikh Omar Jeng who are accused of human rights violations were arrested on 20 February and were being investigated for potential abuses of power.

=== Other decisions ===
The ban on gambling enforced by Jammeh was lifted by Barrow in May 2017, in an effort to attract investors and create employment and economic opportunities. He appointed Landing Kinteh as the new Inspector General of Police (IGP), removing Yankuba Sonko who was appointed by President Jammeh in 2010, with Sonko being redeployed to foreign and diplomatic missions. The Deputy Inspector General of Police Ousman Sowe was demoted to commissioner and was replaced by another commissioner Mamud Jobe. Former Director General of Immigration Service Buba Sangnia who had been convicted during Jammeh's presidency for charge of abuse was reinstated to his position.

=== Foreign policy ===
In February 2017, one of Barrow's first foreign policy actions was to overturn the decision made by Jammeh in October 2016 to leave the International Criminal Court. The process was formalised by a letter sent by the Minister of Foreign Affairs on 10 February, with the government expressing its commitment "to the promotion of human rights", and to "the principles enshrined in the Rome Statute of the International Criminal Court".

On 8 February 2018, the Gambia rejoined the Commonwealth of Nations, which it had left in October 2013.

=== Protests against Barrow in 2019–2020 ===
When Barrow came to power, he had told his supporting coalition that he would call for new elections after three years rather than serving the full five-year term of office prescribed in the constitution.

It's eight parties that came together as a coalition and I am the head. There was an agreement that I will be transitional president for three years, then the parties will come back and we will get a level playing field then we will have an overhaul of the system. We will bring in democratic principles, have a very good foundation for the country, electoral reforms so that the field will be level for everybody. Then we go back to the polls to get a new president.

— Adama Barrow in 2017

Barrow later rescinded that promise. In late 2019 and early 2020, there were widespread protests in the Gambia calling for Barrow to step down after three years, in a movement known as "Operation 3-Years Jotna", or "Three Years is Enough". Hundreds of protesters were arrested, scores of people were injured, and three people died during the protests, amid allegations of excessive force by security officials.

The Gambian government banned the protest movement, saying it is a "subversive, violent and illegal movement". In a report about the protests, Emil Touray of Agence France-Presse quoted a protester as saying "We will protest until Barrow resigns," and another as saying "Let's go and burn everything that belongs to Adama Barrow and his family".

Barrow responded to the protests by saying "No one can force me to leave the presidency before 2021," and a group known as "Five-Years Jotagul" supports Barrow to stay for a full five-year term. Jason Burke reported in The Guardian that Barrow now says he believes the constitution requires him to serve a full five-year term.

== 2021 Presidential Election ==
The 2021 presidential election was held December, 4 2021. The election was contested by many candidates including veteran oppossion Ousainou Darboe of the UDP.

== Ethnic identity and views on tribalism ==
Barrow has been reported to be a member of the Mandingo ethnic group, which is the largest ethnic group in the Gambia (the second largest being the Fula). He has also been reported to be Fula, based on his mother's ethnicity, mostly identified with Fulas in social and cultural terms. Barrow himself declared in a meeting at state House that he is a Fula. He grew up speaking the Fula language in a village and district that are primarily Fula, and both of his wives are Fula.

When asked about the topic and his views on what he envisions for the Gambia, he said he has mixed ethnic background and that he is not a tribalist:

It would be an inclusive country where tribalism will not have a place. I am the least tribalist person you will ever see. I have mixed ethnic blood in me. I am a Sarahule, Mandinka and Fula. Two of my sisters from the same mum and dad are married to Jolas. So tribe is not important. What is important is that we are all Gambians and should unite and work for the progress of our country.

— Adama Barrow in 2016

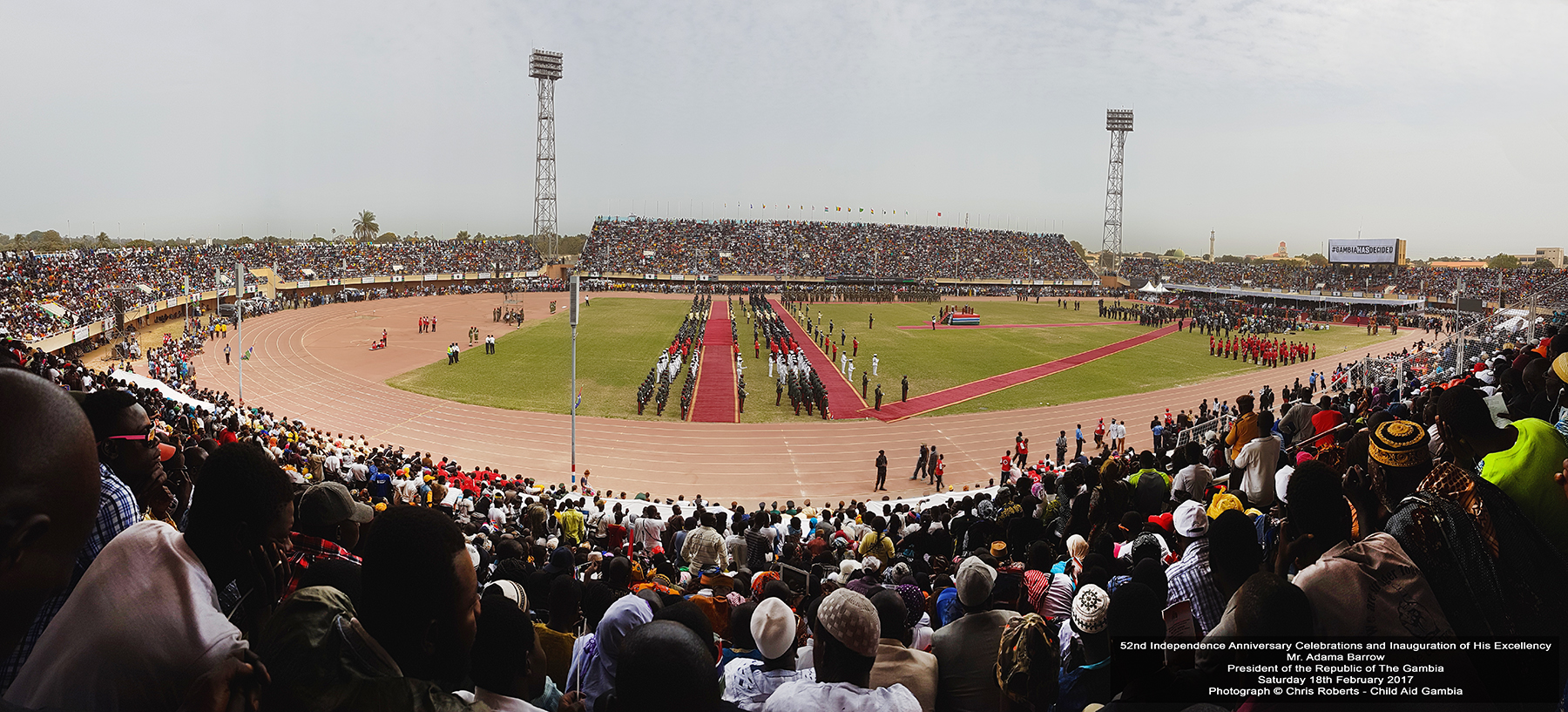
52nd Independence Anniversary Celebrations and Inauguration of His Excellency Mr Adama Barrow, President of the Republic of the Gambia

== Personal life ==
Barrow is a Muslim and says that his faith guides his life and politics. He practices polygamy and has two wives, first wife Fatoumatta Bah, whom he married in 1997, and second wife, Sarjo Mballow. Upon taking office in 2017, he designated his first wife, Fatoumatta Bah-Barrow, as First Lady of the Gambia. Both wives are from the Fula ethnic group. With his wives, he has four living children. Habibu Barrow, his eight-year-old son, died after being bitten by a dog on 15 January 2017. Barrow could not attend his son's funeral because, following ECOWAS recommendations, he was in Senegal where he had escaped the post-electoral trouble.

He is a fan of the English football club Arsenal. His support for the team started in the early 2000s when he was residing in the United Kingdom.

== Honours ==
=== National ===
- Gambia:
  - Grand Master and Grand Commander of the Order of the Republic of The Gambia

=== Foreign honours ===
- Guinea:
  - Grand Cross of the National Order of Merit (2021)
- Guinea Bissau:
  - Recipient of the Medal of Amílcar Cabral (8 September 2025)
- Liberia:
  - Grand Cordon of the Order of the Pioneers of Liberia (2023)
- Sierra Leone:
  - Grand Commander of the Order of the Republic (2021)

== See also ==
- List of current heads of state and government
- List of heads of the executive by approval rating

== Notes ==
Political offices
Preceded by Yahya Jammeh	President of the Gambia; 2017–present	Incumbent
