= Ramatoulie D. K. Sanneh =

Gambian brigadier-general

- Military career
- Allegiance: Gambia
- Branch: Gambia National Army
- Service years: 2006–present
- Rank: Brigadier-General

Brigadier-General Ramatoulie D. K. Sanneh MRG is an officer of the Gambia National Army. She joined as an enlisted member before being commissioned as a captain in May 2006. Sanneh was appointed a Member of the National Order of the Republic of The Gambia in 2010 and was promoted to the rank of brigadier-general in May 2011. She became Gambia's first female army general and has since worked to reduce gender-based violence in the country.

== Biography ==
Ramatoulie D. K. Sanneh enlisted in the Gambia National Army. She was promoted from the non-commissioned officer rank of corporal to the commissioned officer rank of captain in May 2006. In April 2008 she was promoted to the rank of major by Gambian President Yahya Jammeh. On 7 January 2010 she was appointed to become a Member of the National Order of the Republic of The Gambia (MRG) by President Jammeh; at this time she held the rank of colonel.

In May 2011 Sanneh was promoted to the rank of brigadier-general, becoming Gambia's first female army general. The promotion was hailed in the local press as a milestone in the history of the Gambian Army and a step towards empowerment of women. Sanneh was said to have "proven her commitment and dedication to duty and has served her institution with a high sense of respect, loyalty and discipline".

Sanneh has since led campaigns against gender-based violence in Gambia in her role as Chief Adviser to the Gender Focal Officer in the Gambian Army. She committed the Gambian Armed Forces to work with the Network Against Gender Based Violence and noted that the army had set up gender offices in its barracks to provide expertise on the issue.
