= The Gambia–Senegal border =

International border

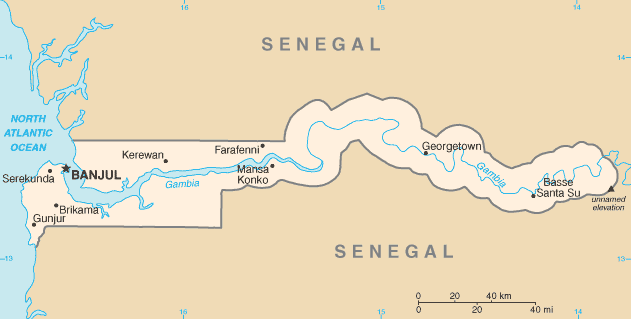
Map of Gambia

The border between The Gambia and Senegal is 749 km (465 mi) in length and runs on either side of the Gambia River.

== Description ==
In the north-west, the border starts at the Atlantic coast at Jinnak Creek, and then proceeds eastwards via a straight line. Just to the west of the Gambian town of Ngeyen Sanjal the border proceeds to roughly parallel the north bank of the Gambia River at a distance of about 10 km, bending round in the far east to encompass Koina and Kantale Kunde within Gambian territory, before proceeding westwards again at about 10 km parallel to the river's southern bank. Just east of Dumbutu (Gambia) the boundary veers south in a straight line, then turns at a right angle to the west, proceeding via a straight line before reaching the San Pedro River; the boundary then follows this river out to the Atlantic Ocean.

== History ==
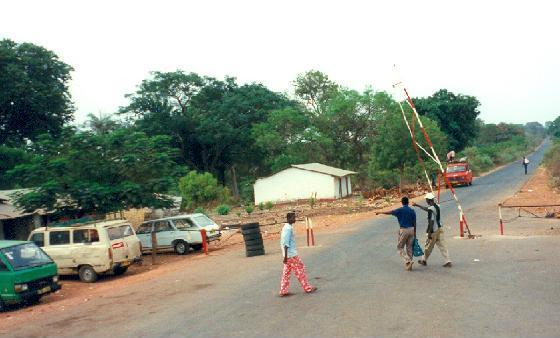
A crossing on the border

France and Britain began exploring and trading along the West African coast from the 17th century, and the two powers contended for supremacy in the Senegambia region over the following centuries. In 1821 Britain established a formal colony on the coast of modern Gambia, threatening nearby French coastal settlements. The 1880s saw an intense competition between the European powers for territories in Africa, a process known as the Scramble for Africa. The process culminated in the Berlin Conference of 1884, in which the European nations concerned agreed upon their respective territorial claims and the rules of engagements going forward. As a result, France and Britain signed a treaty on 10 August 1889 delimiting a boundary between Gambia and Senegal, extending the Gambia east as far as Yarbutenda. Various pillars were erected to mark the boundary on the ground, with further on-the-ground demarcation being conducted in 1911 and 1925.

In 1960 France granted Senegal independence; Gambia became independent in 1965, at which point the border became an international one between two sovereign states. In 1976 the two governments conducted some minor boundary adjustments in the far eastern section by mutual agreement. From 1982 to 1989 the two states were loosely united in the Senegambia Confederation, however this legal coupling was dissolved by Senegal after Gambia refused to transition towards a closer union.

Gambia and Senegal finalized, in July 2026, a "definitive agreement" to clarify the demarcation of their common border.
