= Yacouba (name) =

Yacouba is a common West African masculine given name and surname, a Francized form of Yaqub, the Arabic form of Jacob. Notable people with the name include:

== Given name ==
- Yacouba Bamba (born 1975), Ivorian footballer
- Yacouba Nambelesseny Bamba (born 1991), Ivorian footballer
- Yacouba Camara (born 1994), French rugby union player
- Yacouba Coulibaly (born 1994), Burkinabé footballer
- Yacouba Diarra (born 1988), Malian footballer
- Yacouba Doumbia (born 1997), Malian footballer
- Ismael Yacouba (full name Ismael Yacouba Garba; born 1993), Nigerien taekwondo practitioner
- Yacouba Komara (born 1971), Ivorian footballer
- Yacouba Konaté (born 1953), Ivorian curator, writer and art critic
- Yacouba Diori Hamani Magagi (born 1997), Nigerien footballer
- Yacouba Moumouni (born 1966), Nigerien singer and flautist
- Yacouba Sawadogo (1946–2023), Burkinabé farmer and agronomist
- Yacouba Sido (1910–1988), Nigerien politician
- Yacouba Songné (born 1997), Burkinabé footballer
- Yacouba Sylla (born 1990), French footballer
- Yacouba Isaac Zida (born 1965), Burkinabé military officer

== Surname ==
- Ibrahim Yacouba (born 1971), Nigerien politician
- Ousseini Hadizatou Yacouba (born 1958), Nigerien politician
- Yacouba Ali (full name Seydou Ali Yacouba; born 1992), Nigerien footballer

== See also ==
- Yakuba (disambiguation)
- Yankuba
