= Chief of the Defence Staff (The Gambia) =

Head of the Gambia Armed Forces

- Coat of arms of the Gambia
- Incumbent; Yankuba Drammeh since 5 March 2020
- Appointer: President of the Gambia following consultation with the National Security Council
- Formation: 1997
- First holder: Baboucarr Jatta
- Website: Official website

The Chief of the Defence Staff in the Gambia is the head of the Gambia Armed Forces, and is appointed by the President.

== Role ==
The Chief of the Defence Staff is responsible for the operational control and administration of the Gambia Armed Forces, according to Section 188 (1) of the Constitution of the Gambia. The Chief of the Defence Staff has a permanent place on the National Security Council, authorised by Section 78 of the constitution, and on the Armed Forces Council, authorised by Section 189 of the constitution. In order to appoint or dismiss a Chief of the Defence Staff, the President must first consult with the National Security Council.

== List of Chiefs of the Defence Staff ==
No.	Portrait	Chief of the Defence Staff	Took office	Left office	Time in office	Defence branch	Ref.
1	Baboucarr Jatta	Colonel; Baboucarr Jatta	1999	2004	4–5 years	Gambian National Army	–
2	Vincent Jatta	Lieutenant Colonel; Vincent Jatta	2004	2004	0 years	Gambian National Army	–
3	Assan Sarr	Colonel; Assan Sarr	2004	2005	0–1 years	Gambian National Army	–
4	Ndure Cham	Colonel; Ndure Cham	2005	2006	0–1 years	Gambian National Army	–
5	Lang Tombong Tamba	Major General; Lang Tombong Tamba (born 1965)	2006	2009	2–3 years	Gambian National Army	–
6	Masaneh Kinteh	Lieutenant General; Masaneh Kinteh (born 1968)	9 October 2009	6 July 2012	2 years, 271 days	Gambian National Army	–
7	Ousman Badjie	Lieutenant General; Ousman Badjie (born 1967)	6 July 2012	17 February 2017	4 years, 226 days	Gambian National Army	–
8	Masaneh Kinteh	Lieutenant General; Masaneh Kinteh (born 1968)	17 February 2017	5 March 2020	3 years, 17 days	Gambian National Army	–
9	Yankuba Drammeh	Lieutenant General; Yankuba Drammeh (born 1963)	5 March 2020	29 September 2023	3 years, 208 days	Gambian National Army	–
10	Mamat O.A Cham	Lieutenant General; Mamat O.A Cham	29 Sept 2023	Incumbent	6 years, 186 days	Gambian National Army	–

== List of Deputy Chiefs of the Defence Staff ==
- Masaneh Kinteh, ?–2009
- Yankuba Drammeh, 2009
- Ousman Badjie, 2009
- Yankuba Drammeh, 2009–2010
- Major General Ousman Badjie, 2010–2012
- Vacant, 2012–2015
- Major General Yankuba Drammeh, 2015–2020
