= Kanilai =

- Location in the Gambia
- Coordinates: 13°11′N 16°01′W
- Country: The Gambia
- Division: Western Division
- District: Foni Bondali

Kanilai is a village in southern Gambia, near the border with Senegal. The former president of The Gambia, Yahya Jammeh, was born in this village and expanded it after coming to power. Previously, the town had been a quiet backwater, home to small-scale maize and groundnut farmers and little else. It is now home to a presidential palace, a wrestling arena, a luxury hotel and a game park and zoo. The zoo, which Jammeh said would allow Gambians to "experience African wildlife", was unsuccessful at first, with animals dying due to hunting, predation and insufficient food.

On 19 January 2017, Senegalese troops took control of the village from pro-Jammeh Gambian Army and Movement of Democratic Forces of Casamance (MFDC) troops at the beginning of the Invasion of the Gambia.
