= 1981 Gambian coup attempt =

Failed communist and military coup

1981 Gambian coup d'état attempt
- Part of the Cold War
Date	30 July – 5 August 1981
Location	The Gambia
Result	Coup d'état attempt fails: Dissolution of the Gambia Socialist Revolutionary Party; Emergence of the Senegambia Confederation

Belligerents
The Gambia; Senegal; Supported by: United Kingdom	Gambia Socialist Revolutionary Party

Commanders and leaders
Dawda Jawara; Assan Musa Camara; A. S. M'Boob; Abdou Diouf; Ian Crooke	Kukoi Sanyang; Ousman Bojang; Gibril George †

Units involved
Loyalist elements of the Gambia Field Force; Senegalese Army; 1st Parachute Company; 2nd Parachute Company; 1st Battalion; 4th Battalion; 5th Battalion; Reconnaissance and Support Battalion (BRA); 1st Senegalese Air Group (GAS); GIGN; Naval Commando (FUMACO) Company; Supported by: Special Air Service	Gambia Socialist Revolutionary Party; Elements of the Gambia Field Force

Casualties and losses
20	100

The 1981 Gambian coup d'état attempt began on 30 July 1981 and was quashed in early August following a Senegalese military intervention. The insurrection was carried out by members of the Gambia Socialist Revolutionary Party and disaffected staff of the Gambia Field Force. At the time, President Dawda Jawara was in the United Kingdom attending the wedding of Prince Charles and Lady Diana Spencer. The failure of the coup precipitated the creation of the Senegambia Confederation in 1982.

The coup attempt led to the loss of 500–1,000 lives.

== Origins ==
=== Dissatisfaction in the Field Force ===
The British colonial government had disbanded the Gambia Regiment due to cost concerns in 1958 and created a paramilitary unit of 140 police called the Gambia Field Force. By 1981, the Force was officially made up of 358 police, but may have actually numbered as many as 500. On 27 October 1980, Deputy Commander E. J. Mahoney was murdered by Private Mustapha Danso, at the Bakau Depot. The government explained the incident as a solitary act of mutiny, but still invoked the 1965 common defence agreement with Senegal, leading to the deployment of 150 troops on a joint training exercise called 'Operation Foday Kabba I' for one week. Furthermore, that between one-third and one-half of the Field Force would subsequently participate in the attempted coup, including the recently retired assistant commissioner Ousman Bojang, suggested that dissatisfaction within the Force was widespread.

=== Opposition ===
The Gambian government was concerned about the foreign policy of Libyan leader Muammar Gaddafi in the region. The Libyan embassy in Banjul had been increasing in size and it was believed that it was supporting local dissidents, including the socialist newspaper The Voice. As early as July 1980, the Libyans had been accused of providing military training to Gambians who had been recruited by Senegalese rebel leader, Sheikh Ahmed Niasse of Kaolack. On 29 October 1980, the Libyan embassy was shut down and diplomatic relations were broken off.

The background for the rebels involved in the attempted coup came from the Gambia Socialist Revolutionary Party (GSRP), founded in early 1980 by Gibril L. George, a former businessman. This party was joined by Kukoi Sanyang, a former National Convention Party politician who had traveled to Libya and the Soviet Union. After being declared unlawful on 30 October 1980, the party became the Gambia Underground Socialist Revolutionary Workers Party (GUSRWP), and committed itself to overthrow of the Gambian government. Supposed members of the GUSRWP who swore to overthrow the Gambian government included 10 civilians and 36 Field Force officers.

The ideology of the group was a form of Marxist-Leninist and radical pan-Africanist thinking. They spoke of "Victory for the Gambian revolutionary struggle under the dictatorship of the proletariat and the leadership of a Marxist-Leninist party" and of "Death to neocolonialism, racism and fascism."

== Timeline ==
=== Build-up to the coup attempt ===
Covert meetings in Serekunda were held in late July, led by Kukoi Sanyang, to plan the coup. Of the 15 members of this group, at least five had been involved in the Field Force. A number were also employed as taxi drivers - lending the name 'taxi driver's coup'. The plotters waited until President Dawda Jawara was out of the country to attend the wedding of Prince Charles and Lady Diana Spencer in London before launching the coup d'état.

=== Coup attempt ===
In the early hours of July 30th, 1981, the coup began. Kukoi Sanyang and 10 accomplices made their way on foot to the Bakau Field Force Depot from Serekunda, five miles away. They broke into the depot using wire cutters and met up with a conspirator in the Field Force - Momodou Sonko - who let them into the armoury. Armed with Kalashnikov assault rifles, the group were able to take the Depot and collected Ousman Bojang, the former Assistant Commander. A number of disaffected Field Force officers also joined them, but the greater number fled. Once the Depot was taken, the rebels moved onto other targets of importance. By dawn, they had secured the Radio Gambia buildings, Yundum airport, and the State House in Banjul. Civilian supporters of the group were given weapons at the armoury in order to assist the coup.
