= State Intelligence Services (The Gambia) =

Intelligence agency of the Gambia

Coordinates: 13.4611°N 16.5811°W

The State Intelligence Services (SIS), formerly the National Intelligence Agency (NIA), is the intelligence agency of the Gambia. It was founded following the 1994 military coup d'état by the Armed Forces Provisional Ruling Council (APRFC), which was led by Yahya Jammeh. Its current head is Ousman Sowe.

== History ==
The National Intelligence Agency (NIA) was founded in 1995 by Decree no. 45 issued by the Armed Forces Provisional Ruling Council (AFPRC). The AFPRC had come to power under the leadership of Yahya Jammeh in a 1994 military coup. It was set up to replace the National Security Service of Dawda Jawara's government. Initially, its purpose was to combat threats from dissidents within the armed forces itself. However, its role was quickly expanded to meet both real and perceived challenges from civilian critics and opponents. Despite the transition to a civilian government in 1996, the original military decree was retained, allowing the NIA to operate outside the correct legal framework. The NIA also gained a "feared reputation for harassment of the political opposition and news media critics of the government".

NIA operatives were accused of being involved in the alleged 21 March 2006 coup d'état attempt against Jammeh's regime.

Many reports that NIA operatives used torture have been made. A former NIA operative, who spoke to Human Rights Watch on the condition of anonymity, said that "I’d seen bad things before, but suddenly I was seeing real torture. One woman was beaten so badly she wet herself in fear. I can still remember her screams." He said that during his time at the NIA, he witnessed arbitrary arrests, torture, and enforced disappearances. In 2016, NIA operatives detained Solo Sandeng, a Gambian political activist, and beat him to death in custody. Nine members of the agency, including its former head, were put on trial the following year for Sandeng's death after his remains, among others, were discovered.

The NIA reportedly maintained a small jail inside its headquarters, known as the bambadinka (crocodile hole), where dissidents were tortured.

On 31 January 2017, the newly elected President Adama Barrow announced that the name of the NIA would be changed to the State Intelligence Services (SIS). It was announced the next day that former NIA Deputy Director, Musa Dibba, was appointed as the new Director of the SIS.
