= Gambia Armed Forces =

Combined military forces of Gambia

- The Gambian flag
- Motto: Serving the nation with pride
- Founded: 1965
- Current form: 1996
- Service branches: Gambia National Army; Gambia Navy; Republican National Guard
- Headquarters: Banjul
- Website: gaf.gm

Leadership
- Commander-in-Chief: Adama Barrow
- Minister of Defence: Sering Modou Njie
- Chief of the Defence Staff: Yankuba Drammeh

Personnel
- Military age: 18 for voluntary service
- Active personnel: 4,000 personnel (2019)

Expenditure
- Percent of GDP: 0.8% (2020)

Industry
- Foreign suppliers: India; Pakistan; Russia; South Africa; Turkey; Taiwan (formerly); United States

Related articles
- Ranks: Military ranks of Gambia

The Gambia Armed Forces, also known as the Armed Forces of The Gambia, consists of three branches: the Gambia National Army (GNA), the Gambia Navy, and the Republican National Guard (RNG). It formerly included the Gambia National Gendarmerie (GNG) from the 1980s to 1996, when they were moved under the jurisdiction of the Ministry of the Interior. The commander-in-chief is the president of the Gambia who is currently Adama Barrow, whereas practical control is exercised by the Chief of the Defence Staff who is currently Lieutenant General Ousman Gomez

== History and formation ==
=== Independence to the coup d'etat (1965–1981) ===
At independence from the United Kingdom in 1965, defence and security in The Gambia was the responsibility of the Field Force. The Field Force was a paramilitary unit of the police, consisting of roughly 140 men at independence and rising to around 500 in 1980. It has been formed in 1958 following the disbandment of the Gambia Regiment, part of the British Army. There was little concern about security in The Gambia due to its small size and the safety provided by being totally surrounded by Senegal, with which it had signed a mutual defence pact in 1965.

This lax attitude to defense changed following the 1981 coup d'etat. Executed by members of the Field Force and led by radical leftist politician Kukoi Samba Sanyang, the rebels took advantage of President Dawda Jawara being out of the country to execute a coup d'etat. Having broken into the Field Force armory, the rebels proceeded to release all the prisoners from Mile Two Prison, distributing weapons to those they felt were on their side. The rebels held Jawara's wife and children hostage, one of several acts that undermined public support for the coup. As the remaining members of the Field Force opted to remain neutral, Jawara asked for Senegal to intervene. They sent hundreds of soldiers into The Gambia, including airborne and sea assault units. The rebels were defeated four days after the coup began, having cost the lives of 33 Senegalese soldiers and an estimated 500 Gambians, many of whom were innocent civilians.

=== Senegambia Confederation (1981–1989) ===
A few months following the coup, the Kaur Declaration was signed, which created the Senegambia Confederation. A necessary element of this was the formation of a Gambian military, which came into existence following the Gambia Armed Forces Act 1985. Jawara emphasized that the Gambia Armed Forces (GAF) should be kept "as small as possible". Initially, it consisted of the Gambia National Army (GNA) and the Gambia National Gendarmerie (GNG). The GNA was composed of new recruits and remnants of the Field Force and was trained by a British Army Training Team (BATT). The GNG was composed of new recruits trained by the Senegalese Gendarmerie, on French lines. The Kaur Agreement also created the Confederal Army, which was two-thirds Senegalese and one-third Gambian, able to deploy anywhere in the Confederation.

Gambian soldiers that formed part of the Confederal Army were paid significantly more than Gambian soldiers in the GAF, which created a feeling of resentment. There were also accusations of widespread corruption and nepotism in the selection process for Gambian Confederal troops from the ranks of the GAF. Gambian soldiers were considered junior to their Senegalese counterparts, and Senegal also contributed far more resources and soldiers to the confederation. Senegalese soldiers were given the key tasks of guarding Banjul airport, the port, and the Gambian president. The confederation collapsed in 1989 over a dispute regarding the rotation of the Confederal presidency. In August, Senegal suddenly removed 300 Senegalese troops from The Gambia without warning, forcing the GAF to make up the difference.

=== Increasing discontent (1990–1994) ===
In 1990, ECOWAS despatched troops to Liberia as part of the ECOWAS Monitoring Group (ECOMOG). In August, 105 Gambian soldiers deployed to Monrovia, alongside Ghanaian, Nigerian, Guinean, and Sierra Leonean troops. Some in The Gambia questioned the goal of the mission and others doubted the military's readiness to participate. During the first deployment, two Gambian soldiers, Corporal Modou Bojang and Private Sama Jawo were killed. This contingent arrived home on 13 April 1991. Two months later, soldiers from the unit mutinied and went on a protest march to the State House, over claims they were owed money from their deployment. Jawara agreed to meet them, paying them the money and promising to look into their other requests. Immediately following the mutiny, the commanding officer (CO) of the GNA, Colonel Momodou Ndow Njie, was dismissed.

Less than a month following the incident, the government announced that the Nigerian Army Training Assistance Group (NATAG) would be arriving to help train and equip the Gambian soldiers. Further to this, the head of NATAG, Colonel Abubakar Dada, was to become the new CO of the GNA, which "shocked" the Gambian soldiers. In the nine months between this announcement and NATAG arriving, in 1992 Gambia suffered another mutiny that was very similar to the first, perpetrated by the second contingent of peacekeepers returning from Liberia. These two mutinies demonstrated the growing sense of distrust in the ranks, primarily from ECOMOG peacekeepers and junior officers who saw that promotions were based on favoritism, eroding their confidence in the hierarchy. Another concern was the extent to which Nigerians had control over the senior ranks.

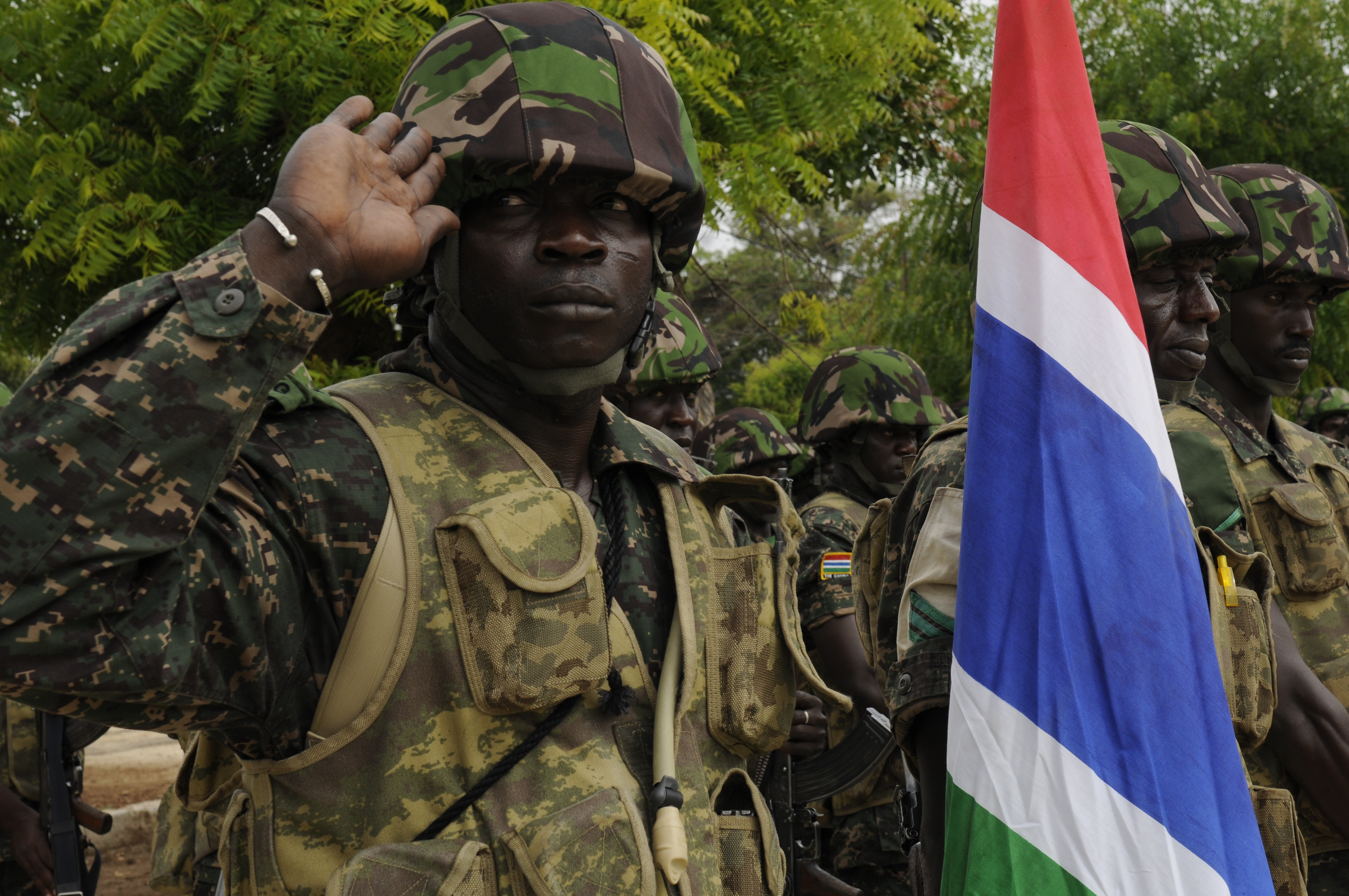
Gambian soldiers in 2012

In 1992, the government disbanded the Gambia National Gendarmerie, which had served to counter the two mutinies in 1991 and 1992. It was merged into a unit in the police called the Tactical Support Group (TSG). This action, according to several former soldiers, caused the 1994 coup d'etat to be "fait accompli" because there was no one to counter the army. On the morning of 22 July 1994, when Jawara was at his office in the State House, he received a report that armed soldiers were approaching. They far outnumbered the contingent of presidential guards at the State House that day, and so Jawara quickly fled. The mutinying soldiers briefly exchanged fire with the TSG and after overpowering the police, had no trouble in taking over the state. The whole affair was over by midday, with no bloodshed.

=== Military rule and the Jammeh era (1994–2016) ===
Lieutenant Yahya Jammeh was announced as head of the new ruling council, the Armed Forces Provisional Ruling Council (AFPRC), along with four other junior officers. The initial press release following the coup pointed to "rampant corruption" as its cause. While civilians were appointed to the government positions, decisions were regularly made through military decrees, of which 70 were made in the first two years. After 26 months in power, Jammeh retired from the military and was elected President in 1996. He began to replace the image of him as a military leader with one of him as a religious and spiritual leader.

Jammeh awarded promotions and pay rises to armed forces personnel and improvements were made to the Yundum barracks. The Gambia Army Revolving Loan Scheme was set up to provide cheap loans to soldiers, and military personnel were afforded educational opportunities. The NATAG contingent also left The Gambia following the coup. In addition to this, Jammeh expanded the structure of the armed forces. In 1995, he announced his intention to establish a navy, which was formed in 1997. The Gambia Armed Forces Act 2008 established a national guard, which included several specialized units in its structure. Under Jammeh, the GAF included the Gambia National Army, the Gambia Navy, and the Republican National Guard. A Chief of the Defence Staff was appointed to head the military with the President as its commander-in-chief.

In May 2011, Gambia appointed its first female general, Ramatoulie DK Sanneh.

== Foreign relations ==
The Gambia's relations with Taiwan, which began following the coup and lasted until 2013, had a number of material benefits for the military. They regularly trained Gambian troops and offered scholarships at Taiwanese military academies to Gambian officers. They also donated uniforms and high-speed boats as well as funding improvements to military facilities. Turkey was another key defense partner for the GAF, with Turkish trainers involved in training 5000 Gambian troops between 1991 and 2005. Around 60 officers and NCOs were also sent to Turkey for training. The agreement ended in 2005, but a Military Advisory Mechanism remained in place. A new bi-lateral defense agreement with Turkey was signed in 2014.

From 2007 to 2009, the Gambia also hosted a team of military advisors from Pakistan, including Brig. Gen Amir Mumtaz, Captain (Navy) Baber Bilal and Gp. Capt Shakir Qazi. The Pakistan Armed Forces Advisory Mission helped establish frameworks and structures to model the Gambian army and navy.

The Gambia has also hosted US and British training teams. Since 2006, soldiers of the Royal Gibraltar Regiment of the British Army have deployed bi-annually to the Gambia. In January 2017, they helped train them prior to their deployment to Sudan as part of the peacekeeping operation. It was the site of Exercise African Endeavour in 2011, which was organised by United States Africa Command (US AFRICOM).

Since 2000, a contingent of Gambian troops have at all times been deployed to peacekeeping activities, first in the ECOWAS Mission in Liberia (ECOMIL) and the United Nations Mission in Liberia (UNMIL), but since 2004 primarily in the African Union United Nations Mission in Darfur (UNAMID). Following the election of Adama Barrow as President of Gambia in 2016, it submitted an application to re-join the Commonwealth of Nations on 22 January 2018 and rejoined on 8 February 2018.

== Organisation ==
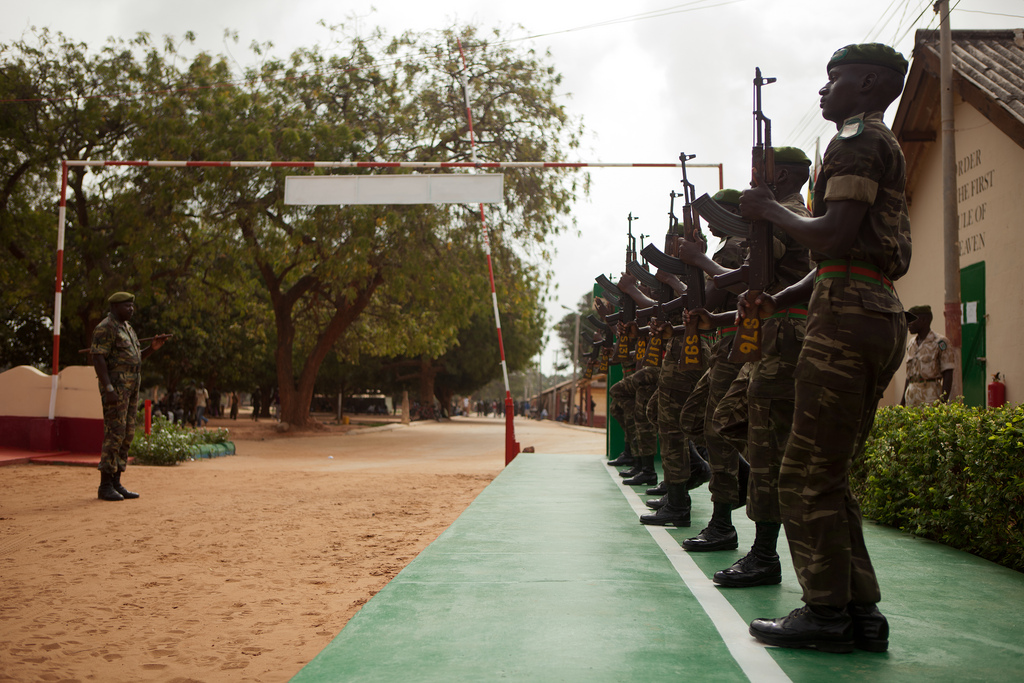
Gambian soldiers practicing drill, July 2011.

=== Leadership ===
- Commander-in-Chief: President of the Republic of The Gambia: President Adama Barrow
  - Chief of the Defence Staff: Major General Mamat .O. Cham
    - Deputy Chief of the Defence Staff: Major General Ousman Gomez
      - Commander, Gambia National Army: Brigadier General Sait Njie
      - Commander, Gambia Navy: Commodore Sambou Lamin Barrow
      - Commander, Republican National Guard: Brigadier General Yaya Drammeh

=== Branches ===
The Gambia Armed Forces Act 1985 established four branches: the Gambia National Army, the Gambia Navy, the Gambia Air Force, and the Gambia National Gendarmerie. In 1992, the GNG merged to become part of a police unit called the Tactical Support Group. The Air Force was never truly operational. In 2008, a Republican National Guard was founded as an additional branch.

==== Gambia National Army ====
Flag of the Gambia National Army

The strength of the Gambia National Army (GNA) differs depending on the source. It has been given as 1,900 soldiers, 1,000 soldiers, or 900 soldiers. It is said to comprise two infantry battalions, one engineering squadron, and a Presidential Guard company. The army has barracks in Fajara, Yundum, Kudang, and Farafenni. In terms of vehicles and equipment, the army has eight Ferret armoured cars, and four M8 Greyhound armoured cars. It is also said to possess at least one M101 howitzer. Turkey donated Gambia 17 Otokar Cobra-1 infantry mobility vehicles and 2 Katmerciler Hızır MRAP vehicles. In addition to 17 Cobra-1s, many high-frequency radios, mine detectors, uniforms, winter jackets and similar military equipment were donated to Gambia.

==== Gambia Navy ====
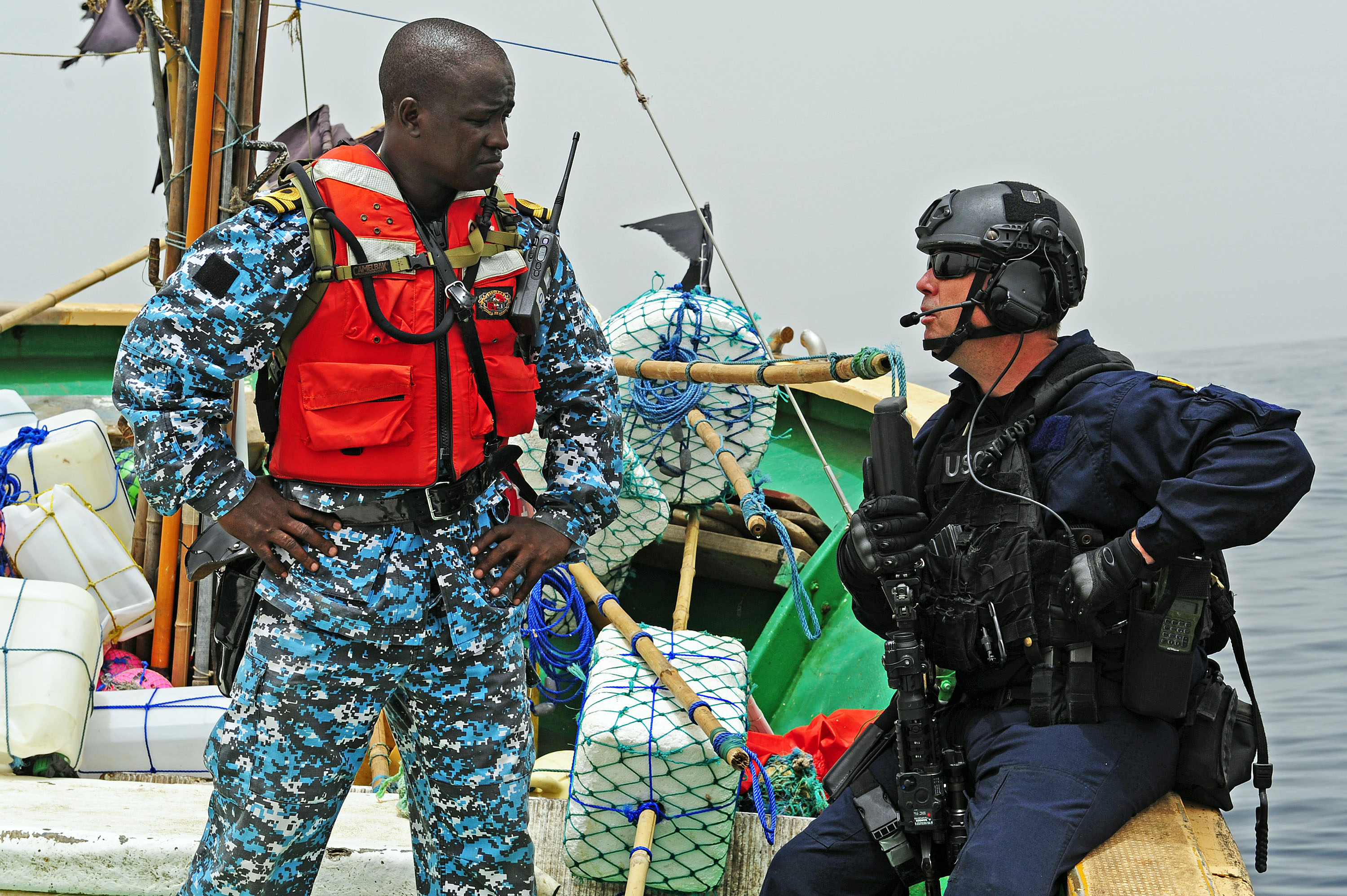
Gambian Navy officer training with the US Coast Guard.

The strength of the Gambian Navy was most recently estimated at approximately 500 personnel. It exists to enforce fishery legislation and regulation, and assistance has been given in that task by the Senegalese Navy. In February 2008, officers of the US Navy helped to install an automatic identification system in the Gambia called the Maritime Security and Safety Information System (MSSIS). In September 2011, a team from the HSV-2 Swift docked in Banjul to conduct a two-week intensive training programme for the Navy. In August 2013, Taiwan donated three new patrol vessels to the Gambia to replace the four ageing vessels of the Dvora-class that it donated in 2009.

==== Gambia Air Force ====
The government considered creating a Gambian Air Force in 2002 and sent pilots to be trained by Ukraine. It purchased its first aircraft, a Sukhoi Su-25, from Georgia in 2003. However, it did not go ahead with the programme and did not announce the creation of an air force.

==== Republican National Guard ====
An amendment to the Gambia Armed Forces Bill in April 2008 included the creation of a new branch of the GAF, the Republican National Guard (RNG).

The RNG is thought to have a strength of 50 personnel and is made up of a State Guard unit, a Special Forces unit, and a Presidential Guard unit.

=== Independent formations ===
- The Gambia National Army Band is the military band of the GAF. It was formed in 1998 by Major Momodou Dibba. It is the successor to the former Gambia Defence Force Band. It consists of 15 soldiers. In July 2001, it released an album called Afingjang which was recorded by Ndaabi studios in Serekunda. In November 2010, the band hosted the United States Navy Band at the Buffer Zone in Tallinding.
- The Child Welfare Unit was founded in 2007 and is responsible for ensuring the protection of children by the military. It is partnered with the child protection services of ECOWAS states.
- Joint Officer's Mess

== Missions ==
According to the Stockholm International Peace Research Institute (SIPRI), the Gambia has contributed troops to a number of peacekeeping operations:

- Since 1997, the Gambia has sent peacekeeping forces to the following places: Sierra Leone, Kosovo, Timor Leste, Ethiopia/Eritrea, Liberia, Côte d'Ivoire, Sudan, Burundi, Darfur, Afghanistan, Nepal, and Chad.
- The Gambia has contributed over 200 troops per year to African Union missions from 2005 to 2007.
- The Gambia contributed to an ECOWAS mission in 2003, sending over 150 troops.
- Former President Jammeh also contributed over 100 troops to UN missions in 2003 and 2004 (over 100 troops each year), and over 200 troops from 2008 to 2010

== Inventory ==
=== Air Force inventory ===
In 2026 it was reported that the Gambian Air Force possessed no combat aircraft. The nation was not mentioned in FlightGlobal's 2026 World Air Forces report.

=== Navy inventory ===
Below is a current fleet of the Gambian Navy, estimated in 2015.

| Class | Image | Origin | Type | Number | In service |
Patrol vessels
| PT Berre Kuntu | | Gambia | | 3 | 2013–present |
| Taipei IPV | | Republic of China | HAI-OU class fast patrol boat | 4 | 1980–present |
| PT Fatimah | | Gambia | | 2 | 1999–present |
| Swift PCF | | United States | Peterson PBI | 1 | 1994–present |

== See also ==
- History of the Gambia
- Royal West African Frontier Force
