= River Gambia National Park =

National park in the Gambia

- IUCN category II (national park)
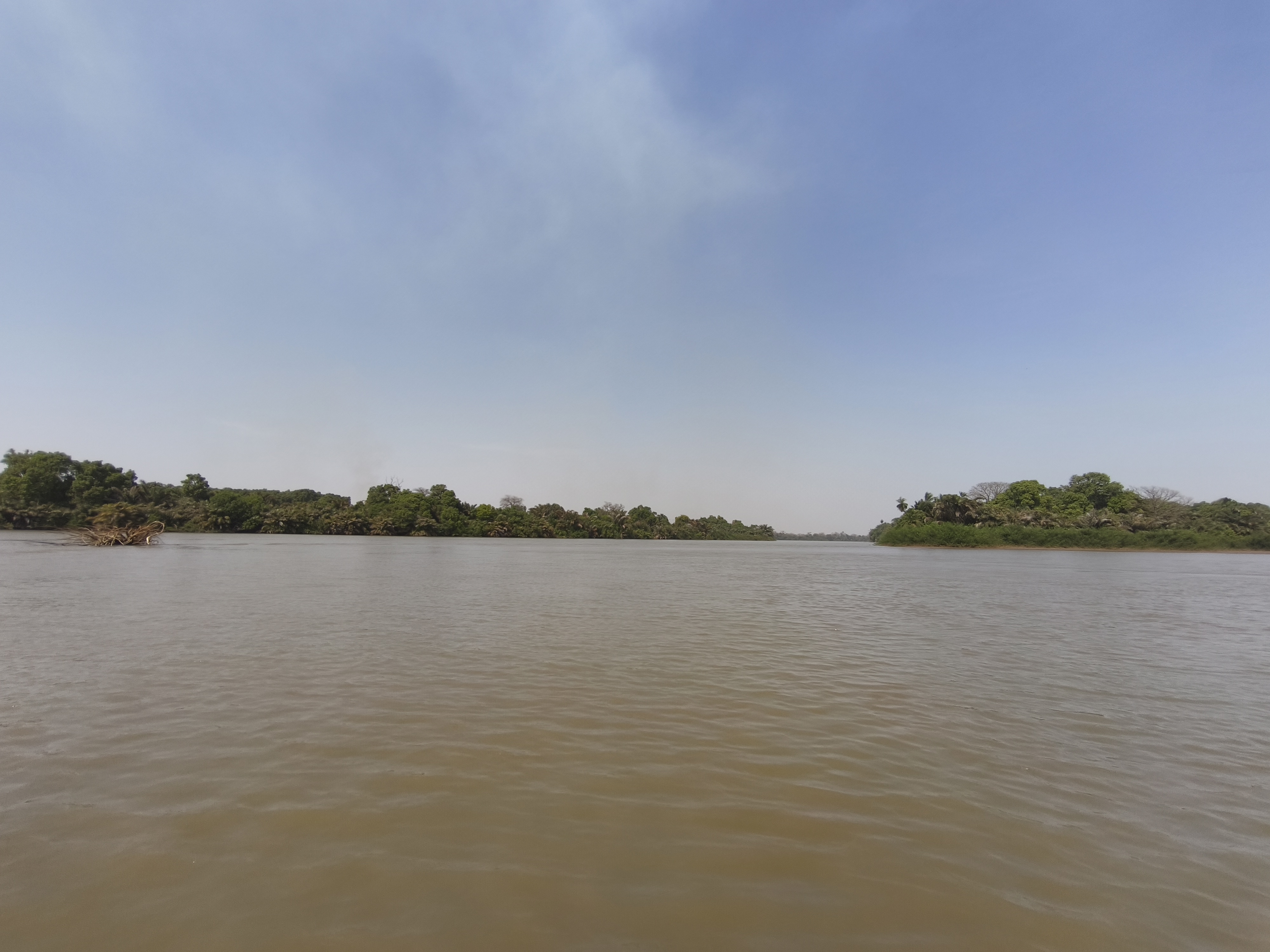

- Location within The Gambia
- Location: Gambia
- Coordinates: 13°38′30″N 14°57′50″W
- Area: 585 ha (1,450 acres)
- Established: 1978

River Gambia National Park is a national park in the Gambia.

== Topography ==
Established in 1978, River Gambia National Park is located in Niamina East district of Central River Division. It lies on the left bank of the Gambia River. The park includes the 585 ha (1,450 acres) Baboon Islands archipelago, which consists of one large and four small islands. The national park is not open to the public.

River Gambia National Park is adjacent to Nyassang Forest Park. On some maps, the two parks are represented together as one area.

== Flora ==
The vegetation on the flat Baboon Islands is typical of a tropical rainforest in the form of a riparian forest.

== Fauna ==
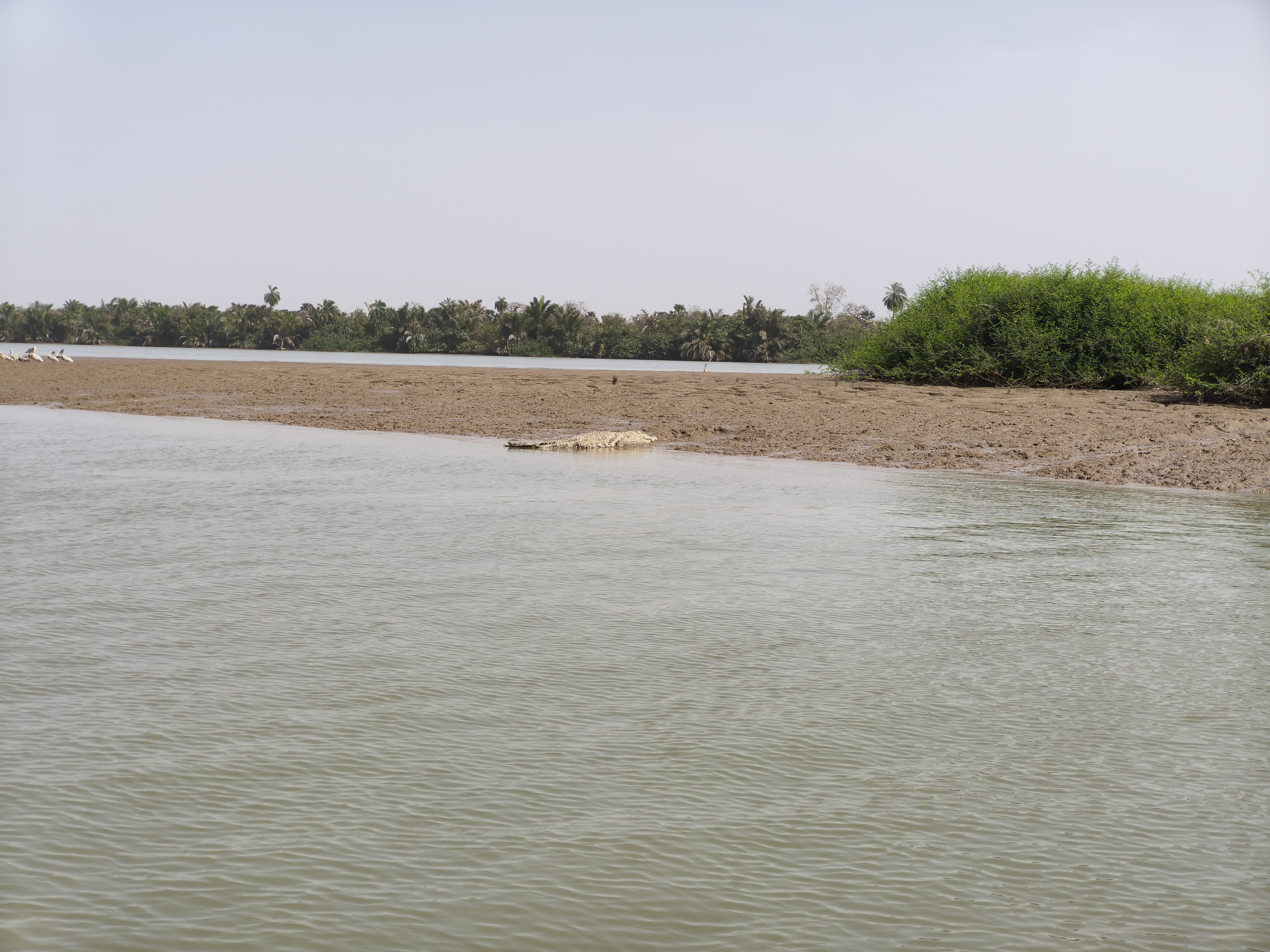
Crocodile in River Gambia National Park

Since 1979, River Gambia National Park is site of a chimpanzee-reintroduction project, conducted by the Chimpanzee Rehabilitation Project (CRP) under the direction of Stella Marsden (daughter of Eddie Brewer). Chimpanzees confiscated from the illegal animal trade are reintroduced into the wild in the park. Marsden was appointed as Officer of the Order of the British Empire for her work. Prior to 1979, the primates were raised in Abuko Nature Reserve. Today, several chimpanzee groups live unmolested by humans on the three largest river islands (435 ha, 77 ha und 53 ha). As of July 2006, there are 77 specimens. In the wild, chimpanzees became extinct in the Gambia in the early 20th century.

For the protection of the animals and visitors, entry onto the islands is not permitted, as chimpanzees can be highly aggressive towards humans. Exceptions are possible only with governmental approval. Even travel by boat around the islands was drastically reduced in 1998. In the past, some attempted to steal chimpanzees from the park.

Apart from the common chimpanzee (Pan troglodytes verus), River Gambia National Park is also home to the Guinea baboon (Papio papio), green monkey (Chlorocebus sabaeus), and western red colobus (Piliocolobus badius). Other mammals include the prolific warthog (Phacochoerus africanus) and some hippopotamuses (Hippopotamus amphibius), which have become rare in the Gambia. In addition, the park is home to the aardvark (Orycteropus afer senegalensis), honey badger (Mellivora capensis), serval (Leptailurus serval brachyura), Hausa genet (Genetta thierryi), African clawless otter (Aonyx capensis), and West African manatee (Trichechus senegalensis).

Of the antelopes, there is the bushbuck (Tragelaphus scriptus), Maxwell's duiker (Cephalophus maxwellii), and common duiker (Sylvicapra grimmia). Reptiles are likewise plentiful, and include the Nile crocodile (Crocodylus niloticus), snakes, and lizards. The bird life is equally species-rich.
