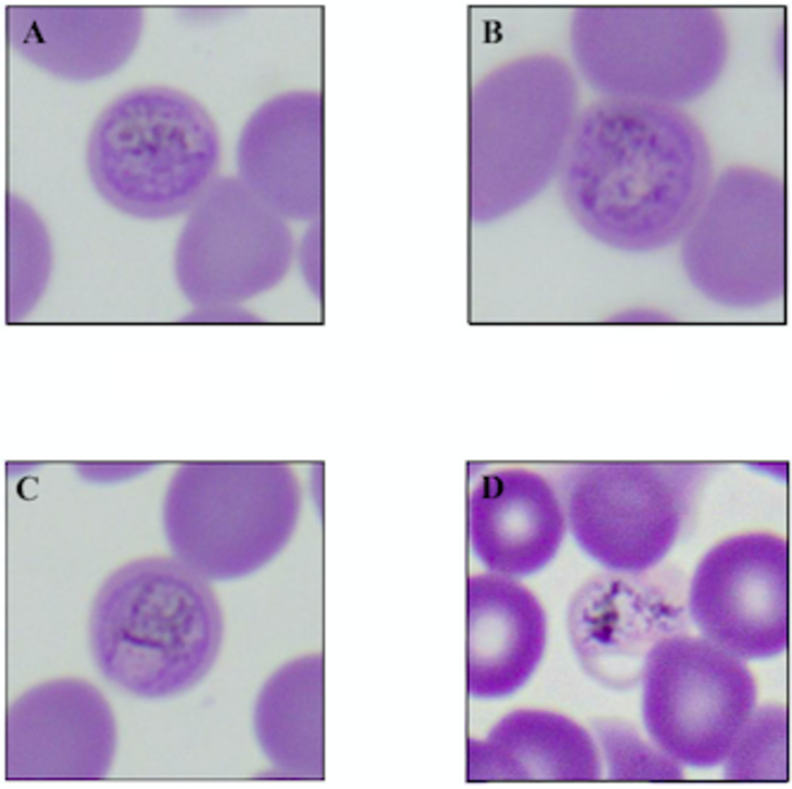
- Erythrocytes with signs of infection by possible Hepatocystis hemoparasites observed in a single individual of Pteropus alecto captured at Redcliffe in December 2018

Scientific classification
- Domain: Eukaryota
- Supergroup: Alveolata
- Phylum: Apicomplexa
- Class: Aconoidasida
- Order: Haemospororida
- Family: Plasmodiidae
- Genus: Hepatocystis; Levaditi & Schoen, 1932

Species
- See text

Synonyms
- Hepatocystes

= Hepatocystis =

Genus of protists

Hepatocystis is a genus of parasites transmitted by midges of the genus Culicoides. Hosts include Old World primates, bats, hippopotamus and squirrels. This genus is not found in the New World. The genus was erected by Levaditi and Schoen, 1932, as Hepatocystes.

== Taxonomy ==
The type species is Hepatocystis kochi. There are currently 25 recognised species in this genus.

=== Species list ===
Select 'show' (at right) to expand list
- Hepatocystis bainae
- Hepatocystis bouillezi
- Hepatocystis brayi
- Hepatocystis brosseti
- Hepatocystis carpenteri
- Hepatocystis cercopitheci
- Hepatocystis epomophori
- Hepatocystis fieldi
- Hepatocystis foylei
- Hepatocystis garnhami
- Hepatocystis hipposideri
- Hepatocystis hippopotami
- Hepatocystis kochi
- Hepatocystis levinei
- Hepatocystis limnotragi
- Hepatocystis malayensis
- Hepatocystis muuli
- Hepatocystis perronae
- Hepatocystis pteropi
- Hepatocystis ratufae
- Hepatocystis rodhaini
- Hepatocystis semnopitheci
- Hepatocystis simiae
- Hepatocystis taiwanensis
- Hepatocystis vassali

== History ==
The first observation of malaria in bats dates to the end of the 19th century when Dionisi described gametocytes in the blood of a bat in 1898. The type species of this genus (Hepatocystis kochi) was described by Laveran in 1899 from the blood of a primate and he named it Plasmodium kochi.

== Life cycle ==
The protozoa are transmitted by the bite of the insect vector. The sporozoites migrate to the liver where they typically form merocysts within the liver parenchyma. These may also develop in the spleen and lungs. Macroscopically these may appear as white to gray nodular foci within the tissue. These lesions within these organs are characterized by well-circumscribed focal fibrosis, accumulation of eosinophils and histiocytes, hemorrhage or hemosiderosis with the loss of normal architecture.

The cystlike exoerythrocytic schizonts are found within the merocysts. These are found around the edges of the merocytes in huge numbers. The central core of the cyst consists of a non-cellular granular material.

Released merozoites either invade other hepatocytes or erythrocytes. Within the erythrocytes the merozoites first become ring forms, then trophozoites and finally gametocytes. The gametocytes are huge and fill the entire erythrocyte. Like those of Plasmodium and unlike those of Hepatozoon their nuclei are Feulgen negative. Haemozoin may be found within the erythrocytes.

Infected erythrocytes are then taken up when the insect vector feeds on the host. Within the vector the sporogonic cycle lasts between 5–6 days. The oocysts develop in the haemocoele chiefly in the head near the brain and eye.

== Pathology ==
The mature merocysts are visible to the naked eye on the hepatic surface. These appear as raised, grayish-white to translucent foci with a central accumulation of fluid. Multiple, depressed areas of fibrosis with calcification representing healed lesions may also be found.

Microscopically the liver cysts have an irregular central space filled with faintly eosinophilic, acellular, flocculent material. Surrounding this is a peripheral rim of myriad, round, lightly basophilic merozoites which measure ~1.0–2.0 mm in diameter. The cysts themselves are delineated by a thin, convoluted, eosinophilic, hyaline capsule. A significant inflammatory response to the merocysts may or may not be present. If a reaction is present, it is typically granulomatous with an admixture of eosinophils and lymphocytes.

The first appearance in the blood is normally two months after infection. The only stage seen in the blood are gametocytes. These double in number for the first three days and mature. Having reached maturity, they gradually decline in number and normally disappear after a month. Secondary episodes may occur at variable intervals.

The early gametocytes consist of minute dense spots of chromatin with a tiny loop of cytoplasm. As the parasite grows, the chromatin tends to spread in a semicircle or into multiple dots. There is no stippling of the erythrocyte.

Mature gametocytes are larger than a normal erythrocyte stain poorly compared to other protozoa. In both male and female gametocytes, the nucleus consists of two portions.

The macrogametocyte is a steel blue color measuring 9.5 micrometres in diameter. The nucleus has a pale pink area with dense chromatin in the middle and is much smaller than that of the microgametocyte.

The microgametocyte stains less densely, is biscuit-colored and measures 9.0 micrometres in diameter. The nucleus is a large, oval, pale pink area occupying one-third to one-half of the parasite.

== Clinical features ==
In endemic areas, the incidence can range from 24 to 75% in nonhuman primates. Although infection with Hepatocystis does not normally cause fever it may cause anaemia in the host.

Some versions of the Duffy antigen have been associated with protection from Hepatocytis infection in yellow baboons (Papio cynocephalus).

== Host records ==
Primates and bats are the most commonly identified host of these parasites. H. bouillezi, H. cercopitheci, H. kochi and H. simiae infect African monkeys. H. semnopitheci and H. taiwanensis infect Asian monkeys. These species may lie in different phylogenetic clades but this is not yet known.

=== Hosts where parasite species is known ===
- H. bainae — Cantor's roundleaf bat (Hipposideros galeritus)
- H. bouillezi — mona monkey (Cercopithecus mona)
- H. brosseti — Franquet's epauletted fruit bat (Epomops franqueti)
- H. carpenteri — hammerhead bat (Hypsignathus monstrosus)
- H. cercopitheci — De Brazza's monkey (Cercopithecus neglectus) and greater spot nosed monkey (Cercopithecus nictitans).
- H. epomorphori — fruit bat (Epomorphorus gambianus)
- H. garnhami — greater short nosed fruit bat (Cynopterus sphinx)
- H. hippopotami — hippopotamus (Hippopotamus amphibius)
- H. hipposideri — large leafnosed bat (Hipposideros armiger terasensis).
- H. kochi — African green monkeys (Cercopithecus aethiops), black mangabey (Cercocebus aterrimus), black crested gibbon (Hylobates concolor)
- H. levinei — grey-headed flying-fox (Pteropus poliocephalus)
- H. muuli — Berdmore's ground squirrel (Menetes berdmorei)
- H. perronnae — Angolan fruit bat (Lissonycteris angolensis), little collared fruit bat (Myonycteris torquata),
- H. pteropi — bat (Cynopterus bracyotis), Horsefield's fruit bat (Cynopterus horsfieldi), bat (Pteropus colinus), common flying fox (Pteropus edwarsii), spectacled flying fox (Pteropus conspicillatus), fruit bat (Pteropus geddiei), black flying fox (Pteropus gouldi), grey-headed flying fox (Pteropus poliocephalus), little red flying fox (Pteropus sacpulatus)
- H. rhodiani — bat (Hipposideros galeritus)
- H. simiae — chacma baboon (Papio ursinus)
- H. semnopitheci — crab eating macque (Macaca irus), Sunda Island leaf monkey (Presbytis aygula)
- H. taiwanensis — Formosan rock macque (Macaca cyclopis)
- H. vassali — squirrel (Callosciurus flavimanus)

=== Parasite species unknown ===
- Red bellied tree squirrel (Callosciurus erythraeus)
- Lesser short nosed fruit bat (Cynopterus brachyotis)
- Fruit bat (Cynopterus horsfieldi)
- Bare-backed fruit bat (Dobsonia moluccense)
- Ethiopian epauletted fruit bat (Epomophorus labiatus)
- Large leafnosed bat (Hipposideros armiger terasensis)
- Diadem leaf-nosed bat (Hipposideros diadema)
- White-cheeked gibbon (Hylobates concolor)
- Formosan macaque (Macaca cyclopis)
- Southern pig tailed macaque (Macaca nemestrina)
- Long-winged bat (Miniopterus schreibersii)
- Olive baboon (Papio anubis)
- Yellow baboon (Papio cynocephalus)
- Formosan giant flying squirrel (Petaurista grandis)
- Orangutan (Pongo pygmaeus)
- Black flying fox (Pteropus alecto)
- Small flying fox (Pteropus hypomelanus)
- Horseshoe bat (Rhinolophus) species

== Vectors ==
Known vectors belong to the genus Culicoides. Species of Streblidae may also be able to act as vectors but this is not yet certain.

- H. brayi — Culicoides nubeculosus and Culicoides variipennis
- H. kochi — Culicoides adersi Ingram and Macfie 1923
- H. levinei — Culicoides nubeculosus
