= Chimpanzee Rehabilitation Project =

Rehabilitation center in the Gambia

The Chimpanzee Rehabilitation Project (CRP) is a rehabilitation center associated with the Pan African Sanctuary Alliance (PASA), located at the River Gambia National Park (RGNP), established in 1979. It is the home of 100 chimpanzees living free in four separate groups spread in three islands.

The main mission of the rehabilitation center is the caring for chimpanzees. The center allows visits by boat to view the primates, but humans cannot have contact with them.

== History ==
=== Background ===
Gambia’s Chimpanzee Rehabilitation Project started as an animal orphanage established in 1969 by the Director of the Gambia's Wildlife Department Eddie Brewer and his daughter Stella. From 1969 to 1974, they caretook several orphaned chimpanzees rescued from traffickers.

In 1974, Stella Brewer released the chimpanzees into Senegal’s Niokolo-Koba National Park. However, after an incident with a wild community, in 1979 they relocated the survivor chimpanzees to the River Gambia National Park.

=== Foundation ===
In 1979, the Chimpanzee Rehabilitation Project was founded with a group of nine chimps on an island, including a chimpanzee raised as a human called Lucy. From the beginning, the chimpanzees were temporarily housed in the Abuko Nature Reserve, in The Gambia, where no chimpanzees were released. Later, the primatologists Stella Brewer and Janis Carter moved to the Baboon Islands in the River Gambia National Park, located 280 km from Banjul.

In the beginning, the primatologist Janis Carter was with the group. She taught the chimpanzees how to recognize food sources and predators. After an incident with a young male chimp, she left the island.

In 1982, the rehabilitation center counted 26 chimpanzees distributed across three different islands.

In January 2006, founder-director Stella Brewer died at the age of 56. She was buried at the Project's Camp. Janis Carter remained as Project Manager.

=== Current project ===
Now, there is no contact between humans and chimps. The center is focused on four areas: education, research, eco-tourism, and development. The center reports 100 chimpanzees living on three islands.
