= Hepatocystis epomophori =

Scientific classification
- Domain: Eukaryota
- Clade: Sar
- Clade: Alveolata
- Phylum: Apicomplexa
- Class: Aconoidasida
- Order: Haemospororida
- Family: Plasmodiidae
- Genus: Hepatocystis
- Species: H. epomophori

Binomial name
- Hepatocystis epomophori Rodhain, 1926

Species of single-celled organism

Hepatocystis epomophori is a species of parasitic protozoa. They are transmitted by flies of the genus Culicoides and infect mammals.

== Taxonomy ==
This species was described in 1926 by Jean Rodhain.

== Description ==
This species is similar to Hepatocystis brosseti and Hepatocystis carpenteri.

== Distribution ==
This species is found in the Congo Basin.

== Hosts ==
This species infects the fruit bat (Epomorphorus gambianus).
