= Hepatocystis carpenteri =

Scientific classification
- Domain: Eukaryota
- Clade: Sar
- Clade: Alveolata
- Phylum: Apicomplexa
- Class: Aconoidasida
- Order: Haemospororida
- Family: Plasmodiidae
- Genus: Hepatocystis
- Species: H. carpenteri

Binomial name
- Hepatocystis carpenteri Miltgen et al., 1980

Species of single-celled organism

Hepatocystis carpenteri is a species of parasitic protozoa. They are transmitted by flies of the genus Culicoides and infect mammals.

== Taxonomy ==
This species was described by Miltgen et al. in 1980.

== Distribution ==
This species is found in Gabon.

== Description ==
The intrahepatic schizonts (maximum 900 by 450 micrometres or 0.035 by 0.018 inches) are larger than those of other species and the cyst wall has a spongy appearance which appears to be unique.

It must be distinguished from Hepatocystis epomophori and Hepatocystis brosseti.

== Hosts ==
This species is known to infect the hammer-headed bat (Hypsignathus monstrosus).
