= Hepatocystis bainae =

Scientific classification
- Domain: Eukaryota
- Clade: Sar
- Clade: Alveolata
- Phylum: Apicomplexa
- Class: Aconoidasida
- Order: Haemospororida
- Family: Plasmodiidae
- Genus: Hepatocystis
- Species: H. bainae

Binomial name
- Hepatocystis bainae Mialhe and Landau, 1977

Species of single-celled organism

Hepatocystis bainae is a species of parasitic alveolates belonging to the phylum Apicomplexa

Species in this genus are parasitic unicellular eukaryotes transmitted by flies of the genus Culicoides and infect mammals.

== History ==
This species was described in 1977 by Mialhe and Landau.

== Geographical distribution ==
This species is found in Malaysia.

== Description ==
The hepatic schizonts are small and the colloid is repartitioned. It is most similar morphologically to Hepatocystis rodhaini.

== Host record ==
This species infects Cantor's roundleaf bat (Hipposideros galeritus).
