= Hepatocystis taiwanensis =

Scientific classification
- Domain: Eukaryota
- Clade: Sar
- Clade: Alveolata
- Phylum: Apicomplexa
- Class: Aconoidasida
- Order: Haemospororida
- Family: Plasmodiidae
- Genus: Hepatocystis
- Species: H. taiwanensis

Binomial name
- Hepatocystis taiwanensis Garnham, 1951

Species of single-celled organism

Hepatocystis taiwanensis is a species of parasitic protozoa. They are transmitted by flies of the genus Culicoides and infect monkeys.

== Taxonomy ==
This species was described in 1941 by Yokogawa in Formosan rock macaque (Macaca cyclopis). It was reclassified as a species of Hepatocystis by Garnham in 1951.

== Distribution ==
This species is found in Taiwan.

== Hosts ==
This species infects Formosan rock macacque (Macaca cyclopis).
