= Chimfunshi Wildlife Orphanage =

Chimpanzee refuge in Zambia

Chimfunshi Wildlife Orphanage Trust
- Abbreviation: CWOT
- Formation: 1983
- Founder: David Siddle; Sheila Siddle
- Type: Non-governmental organization
- Purpose: Chimpanzee rescue, rehabilitation and long-term care; conservation education; community development
- Headquarters: Copperbelt Province, Zambia
- Region served: Zambia (with international rescues)
- Methods: Rescue; rehabilitation; semi-free-ranging enclosures; research; outreach
- Affiliations: Pan African Sanctuary Alliance (PASA)
- Volunteers: Yes

Chimfunshi Wildlife Orphanage Trust (CWOT) is one of the oldest and biggest sanctuaries for orphaned and rescued chimpanzees, located in Zambia's Copperbelt Province. Established in 1983, the sanctuary began as a family-run operation when David and Sheila Siddle took in a severely injured infant chimpanzee named "Pal" after it was brought to their cattle ranch by a game ranger. The Siddle’s nursed Pal back to health, marking the beginning of CWOT’s mission to provide care and rehabilitation for chimpanzees in need.

As news of Pal’s recovery spread, the Siddles were soon overwhelmed with requests to take in other orphaned chimpanzees. Many chimpanzees at CWOT were rescued from poachers who sought to smuggle them into Zambia for the illegal pet trade, while others came from zoos and circuses around the world, including Africa, Asia, Europe, and South America.

In 1989, Stephan Louis, a German entrepreneur, got to know the couple and their work, founded the non-profit Chimfunshi Verein zum Schutz bedrohter Umwelt e.V. in Hamburg/Germany to support the Chimfunshi Wildlife Orphanage and ensure its continued operation.

In 1995, under Stephan’s and David's initiative, the non-profit Chimfunshi Wildlife Orphanage Trust (CWOT) was established in Zambia to give the sanctuary a solid, sustainable long-term foundation.

The sanctuary is one of the founders and a member of the Pan African Sanctuary Alliance (PASA) and has received widespread recognition for its efforts in chimpanzee conservation.

In 2002, Sheila Siddle published her autobiography, In My Family Tree: A Life With Chimpanzees, which garnered significant praise. The Siddles were also honoured with the Jane Goodall Award in recognition of their pioneering work in establishing CWOT.

Since the death of Stephan Louis in 2011, his brother Sebastian Louis has continued his work as Chairman of the Board of Trustees and Chairman of the Board of Chimfunshi Germany.

After Sheila and David Siddle died, their daughter took over to keep their legacy going. In 2022, the Board appointed an Executive Director to develop the project. Thus, since 2023, CWOT has been developing a new strategy with a holistic approach that integrates the Chimfunshi Sanctuary, the local Community and the Conservation in a unified framework called the 3Cs, with the aim of creating a model where the community lives in harmony with nature. The core missions are as follows: 1) To support wildlife law enforcement and to rescue and rehabilitate orphaned chimpanzees and other wildlife by providing long-life care 2) to engage children and the community to protect chimpanzees, local wildlife, and the Miombo forest through education and 3) to reduce poverty and improve local community well-being through medical care, gender equality, alternative income community-based projects (e.g. sustainable farming) and capacity building.

== Chimfunshi Sanctuary ==
Covering 10,000 hectares of land, CWOT currently provides 8 semi-free ranging enclosures for 154 chimpanzees. The total area of these enclosures (including the larger ones of 80 hectares) ensures that the chimpanzees with ample space to express natural behaviours.

In addition to the chimpanzees, the orphanage is home to a variety of other rescued animals, including African grey parrots, bush babies, vervet monkeys, various antelopes, birds of prey, and many other animals in need of rescue. With the exception of the chimpanzees and African grey parrots, which are not indigenous to Zambia, all the other animals will be released back into the wild in a secure location. In the case of the vervet monkey, CWOT is working closely with the Zambia Primate Project, which will oversee the rehabilitation and release process in Kafue National Park.

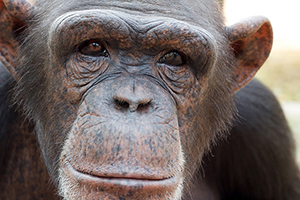
An old chimpanzee at Chimfunshi

== Community ==
CWOT is dedicated to supporting sustainable development in local communities. The orphanage fosters partnerships that promote both livelihoods and conservation, focusing on education, sustainable agriculture, and eco-tourism. These initiatives empower communities to protect their natural resources and live in harmony with wildlife, ensuring long-term benefits for both people and the environment. Over 70 employees live with their families (around 400 people in total) on site. CWOT offers employment, education and training, housing with access to water and electricity as well as basic medical care. In addition, a primary and junior secondary school with an attached pre-school is run, which is attended by more than 240 children from the region.

== Conservation ==
CWOT plays a key role in the conservation of diverse natural ecosystems and species. The sanctuary is located within the Miombo-Kafue river complex, which encompasses a variety of habitats, including Wet Miombo woodland, mushitu (riverine) forest, riparian forest, grasslands, and wetlands. The Kafue River, which forms part of CWOT's border, transforms into a vast flooded plain during the rainy season (October to May), creating dynamic ecosystems. The Miombo-Kafue complex also includes floodplains, dry plains, and grassy wet dambos, along with the critical Mushitu forest strips.

Mushitu forest, characterized by its taller trees and higher biodiversity compared to the more widespread Brachystegia/Julbernardia Miombo woodlands, plays an important role in protecting watercourses and maintaining perennial streams. Vulnerable to fire, it is essential for conserving both water resources and the surrounding ecosystem. Overall, the Miombo woodlands form a rich mosaic of habitats that are vital for carbon sequestration, biodiversity reservation - particularly birdlife - and supporting the livelihoods of local communities.

CWOT was designated as an “Important Bird Area” (IBA #22) in 2010, a global recognition given to areas that are crucial for the conservation of bird populations. CWOT is one of about 10,000 IBAs worldwide. Endangered bird species found at CWOT include the Wattled Crane, the Hooded Vulture, the Ground Hornbill, the Bateleur Eagle, … In addition to its birdlife, CWOT is home to a wide variety of mammals, reptiles, insects, and, seasonally, mushrooms, further contributing to its ecological significance.

== Research ==
CWOT has developed into a prominent center for education and research, offering a unique opportunity to study chimpanzees in a near-natural environment and within large social groups. The sanctuary serves as an ideal setting for observing the complex social behaviours, communication, and cognitive abilities of chimpanzees.

At the intersection of animal welfare and scientific inquiry, CWOT attracts primate researchers and scientists from around the world.

The Education Centre at CWOT also draws students from the U.S. and Europe, as well as Zambian schoolchildren and their teachers. The sanctuary regularly collaborates with leading scientific institutions, including the Max Planck Institutes for Evolutionary Anthropology (Leipzig, Germany) and Psycholinguistics (Nijmegen, Netherlands) and Gonzaga University (USA), further strengthening its role as a hub for primate research and conservation education.

== Tourism ==
CWOT is located 65 km west of Chingola, along the banks of the Kafue River, making it a popular tourist destination for both local residents of Zambia's Copperbelt region and international visitors. While chimpanzees are not native to Zambia - with the nearest wild populations located about 500 km to the north - CWOT plays a critical role in the conservation of the species, especially given that some wildlife smuggling routes from the Congo pass through Zambia. CWOT welcomes visitors year-round, offering the opportunity to learn about chimpanzee conservation, the local wildlife, and the Miombo landscape.

== Volunteering ==
CWOT offers volunteer programs for individuals looking to support the sanctuary's work. Volunteers have the opportunity to assist with the daily care of chimpanzees, including behavioural enrichment activities and enrichment exercises. They can also contribute to infrastructure development projects in the local community, help at the organic farm, or support the health post. Volunteers with veterinary expertise may also assist with the care of the animals under the supervision of the resident vet.
