= Eddie Brewer =

British conservationist

- Born: Edward Frank Brewer; 19 October 1919; London, England
- Died: 19 April 2003 (aged 83); Pwhelli, North Wales
- Occupation: Conservasionist
- Spouse: Lillian Jones (1942–1986)

Edward Frank Brewer (19 October 1919 – 19 April 2003) was a British conservationist and the first director of the Wildlife Department of the Gambia. He was a pioneer in the rehabilitation of chimpanzees with his daughter Stella Brewer.

During his service as a Colonial Forestry Officer, Brewer tracked down poachers, spearheaded the mapping of protected lands, and drafted legislation to protect the Gambia's flora and fauna.

== Biography ==
Eddie Brewer was born in London and studied at Holbeach Road School. Since then, he showed interest in nature studies, poetry, and bodybuilding.

Before training as a forester, Brewer served with the Royal Air Force. He entered the Colonial Service in 1950. He helped to ensure the survival of the coco-de-mer as Forestry Officer to Seychelles.

=== Officer in Gambia ===
In 1957, Brewer was transferred to the Gambia where he was responsible for establishing the Nyambai plantations with gmelina, a decision then criticized by the British Forestry Adviser for the high costs. However, the plantations showed to produce a high amount of saw logs and firewood.

When Eddie Brewer was an officer in charge of the Gambia's Forestry Division, a deputation of tribesmen demanded to shoot a leopard that was eating their pigs. Following the trace of the leopard, he realized the importance of Abuko as a natural environment.

Brewer lobbied to declare the area of Abuko as a nature reserve. After that, he became the first director of the Wildlife Department of the Gambia.

In 1969, Brewer obtained William, an orphaned chimpanzee that became the founding member of the Chimpanzee Rehabilitation Project. As Director of the Gambia's Wildlife Department, he confiscated several chimpanzees that would be rehabilitated and released in River Gambia National Park.

Brewer provided a range of employment opportunities for Gambians during his years of services, as nature guiding for tourists, honey production, sawmilling, and exportation of mangoes. The interest of Brewer in apiculture led him to set up a bee-keeping unit. Some Gambians were sent abroad for training in apiculture, and this allowed to create an apiculture industry in the zone. was In 1992, Brewer retired from his service in the Gambia after the murder of an English girl whom he asked to house-sit for him while he was in Britain. The incident discouraged Brewer for a further tour of duty.

== Awards ==
In 1962, Brewer was appointed Member of the Most Excellent Order of the British Empire for services to forestry.

In 1974, Brewer was appointed as Officer of the Most Excellent Order of the British Empire for services to wildlife conservation in the Gambia.

In 1980, Prince Bernhard of the Netherlands appointed Brewer as an Officer of the Order of the Golden Ark. In the same year, Brewer was appointed as Grand Officer, National Order of the Lion by President Senghor of Senegal.

In 1983, Brewer was laureated with the FZS Silver Medal for outstanding service to nature conservation, given by the Frankfurt Zoological Society.
