= Hepatocystis perronae =

Scientific classification
- Domain: Eukaryota
- Clade: Sar
- Clade: Alveolata
- Phylum: Apicomplexa
- Class: Aconoidasida
- Order: Haemospororida
- Family: Plasmodiidae
- Genus: Hepatocystis
- Species: H. perronae

Binomial name
- Hepatocystis perronae Landau and Adam, 1971

Species of single-celled organism

Hepatocystis perronae is a species of parasitic protozoa. They are transmitted by flies of the genus Culicoides and infect mammals.

== Taxonomy ==
This species was described in 1971 by Landau and Adam.

== Distribution ==
This species is found in Angola and Congo-Brazzaville.

== Hosts ==
This species infects the Angolan fruit bat (Lissonycteris angolensis) and the little collared fruit bat (Myonycteris torquata).
