= Pan African Sanctuary Alliance =

Association of African wildlife centers

The Pan African Sanctuary Alliance (PASA) is the largest association of wildlife centers and sanctuaries in Africa, consisting of 23 organizations in 13 countries. As an alliance, PASA works to secure a future for Africa’s primates by rescuing and caring for orphaned and abused apes and monkeys, protecting endangered primates from extinction, educating the public, and empowering communities. PASA strengthens the capacity of its member sanctuaries by facilitating collaboration, sharing resources, and representation internationally.

PASA is a 501(c)(3) non-profit charity registered in the US, a partner of the United Nations Environment Programme's Great Apes Survival Partnership, and is a member of the Species Survival Network.

== Wildlife Conservation ==
PASA works to address the long term threats to primates, by protecting invaluable forest habitats, working with law enforcement to crack down on wildlife crime, and strengthening wildlife policy.

Three-quarters of PASA sanctuaries conduct anti-poaching patrols in primate habitats. Organizations that are members of the Pan African Sanctuary Alliance have achieved reintroduction of great ape species in the wild and release chimpanzees and bonobos in the world. Among the PASA wildlife centers, about half are working on reintroducing individuals to the wild.

== Rescue and Care ==
PASA sanctuaries receive hundreds of primates rescued from the illegal wildlife trade and inhumane situations each year.

PASA provides emergency support including funding and the technical assistance necessary to reach established standards of care and welfare for these primates confiscated from illegal trade practices. To do this, PASA provides training and skill-building workshops that bring together staff from member sanctuaries across Africa with other veterinary and medical experts from around the world. The sanctuaries have served to study veterinary topics. For example, non-invasive tests for tuberculosis and parasitology researches have been conducted in their installations. PASA distributes equipment, supplies, and medicine that enable wildlife centers to deliver expert healthcare and rehabilitation services for confiscated primates and other wildlife.

== Education and Community Empowerment ==
The Pan African Sanctuary Alliance provides funding, training, and materials to assist its wildlife centers in their conservation efforts within their communities. The centers facilitate projects that aim to promote sustainable incomes and include activities, like planting low impact crops that do not attract wildlife, creating native tree nurseries, raising livestock sustainable in the local environment to replace bushmeat hunting, and developing women's craft cooperatives that use local renewable or recycled materials to make crafts that can be sold to provide income.

According to a study that involved the administration of surveys to each of the PASA member wildlife centers, "Sanctuaries reported that they provided employment for over 550 local community members across Africa, as well as resources for community education and infrastructure, with an economic impact over $3 million per year."

== PASA Members ==
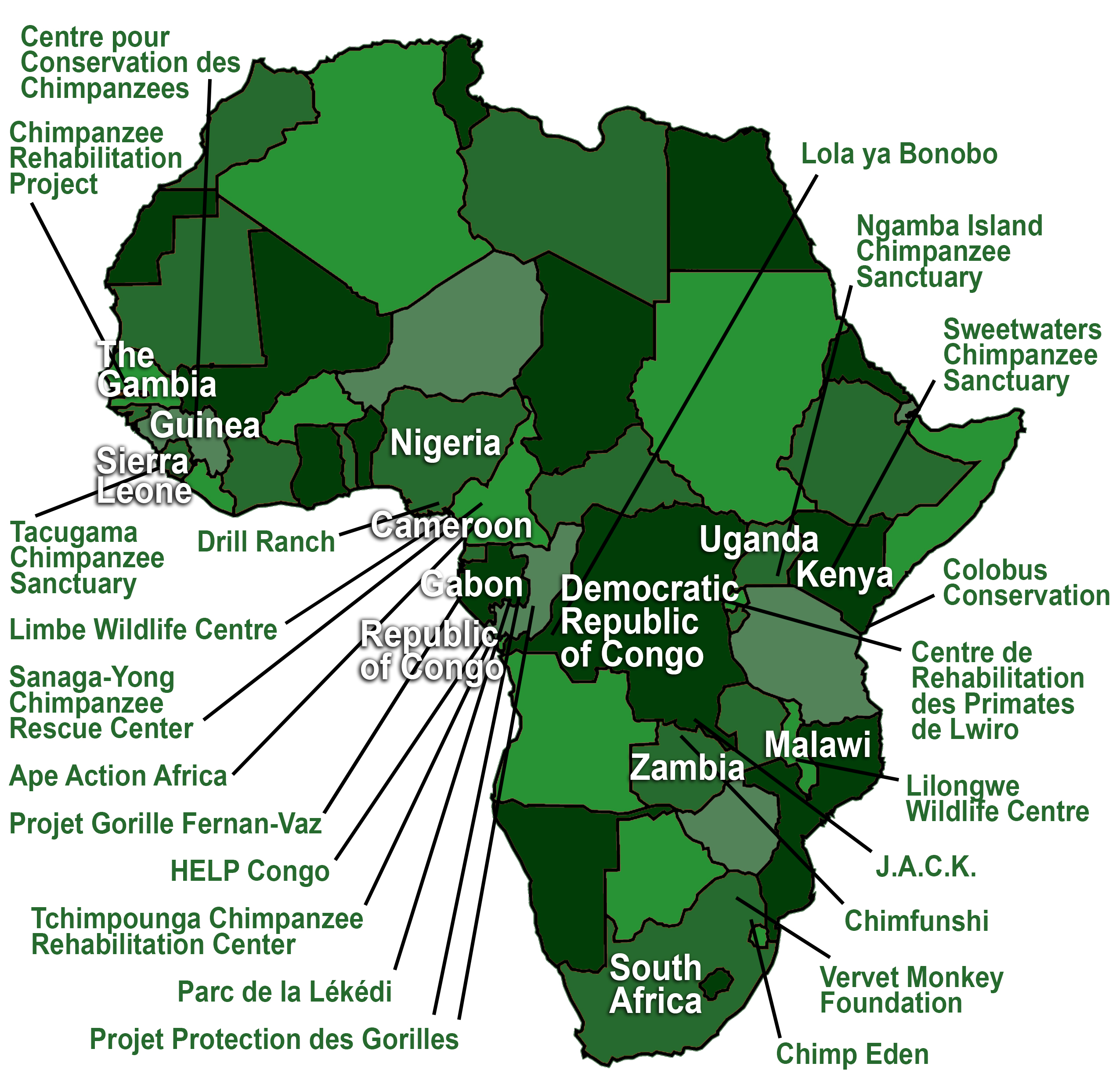
Map of PASA Member Sanctuaries and Wildlife Centers

- Ape Action Africa (Cameroon)
- Centre pour Conservation des Chimpanzees (CCC) (Guinea)
- Chimfunshi Wildlife Orphanage (Zambia)
- Chimp Eden (South Africa)
- Chimpanzee Rehabilitation Project (Gambia)
- Colobus Conservation (Kenya)
- Drill Ranch (Nigeria)
- Fernan-Vaz Gorilla Project (Gabon)
- HELP-Congo (Congo)
- Jeunes Animaux Confisques au Katanga (J.A.C.K.) (Democratic Republic of the Congo) (DRC)
- Lilongwe Wildlife Centre (Malawi)
- Limbe Wildlife Centre (Cameroon)
- Lola ya Bonobo (DRC)
- Lwiro Primate Rehabilitation Centre (DRC)
- Ngamba Island (Chimpanzee Sanctuary and Wildlife Conservation Trust) (Uganda)
- Project Protection des Gorilles-Congo (Congo)
- Project Protection des Gorilles-Gabon (Gabon)
- Sanaga-Yong Chimpanzee Rescue Center (IDA Africa) (Cameroon)
- Sweetwaters Chimpanzee Sanctuary (Kenya)
- Tacugama Chimpanzee Sanctuary (Sierra Leone)
- Tchimpounga Chimpanzee Rehabilitation Centre (Congo)
- Vervet Monkey Foundation (South Africa)
