= Lilongwe Wildlife Centre =

Wildlife sanctuary in Malawi

Coordinates: 13°58′20″S 33°47′02″E

Lilongwe Wildlife Trust
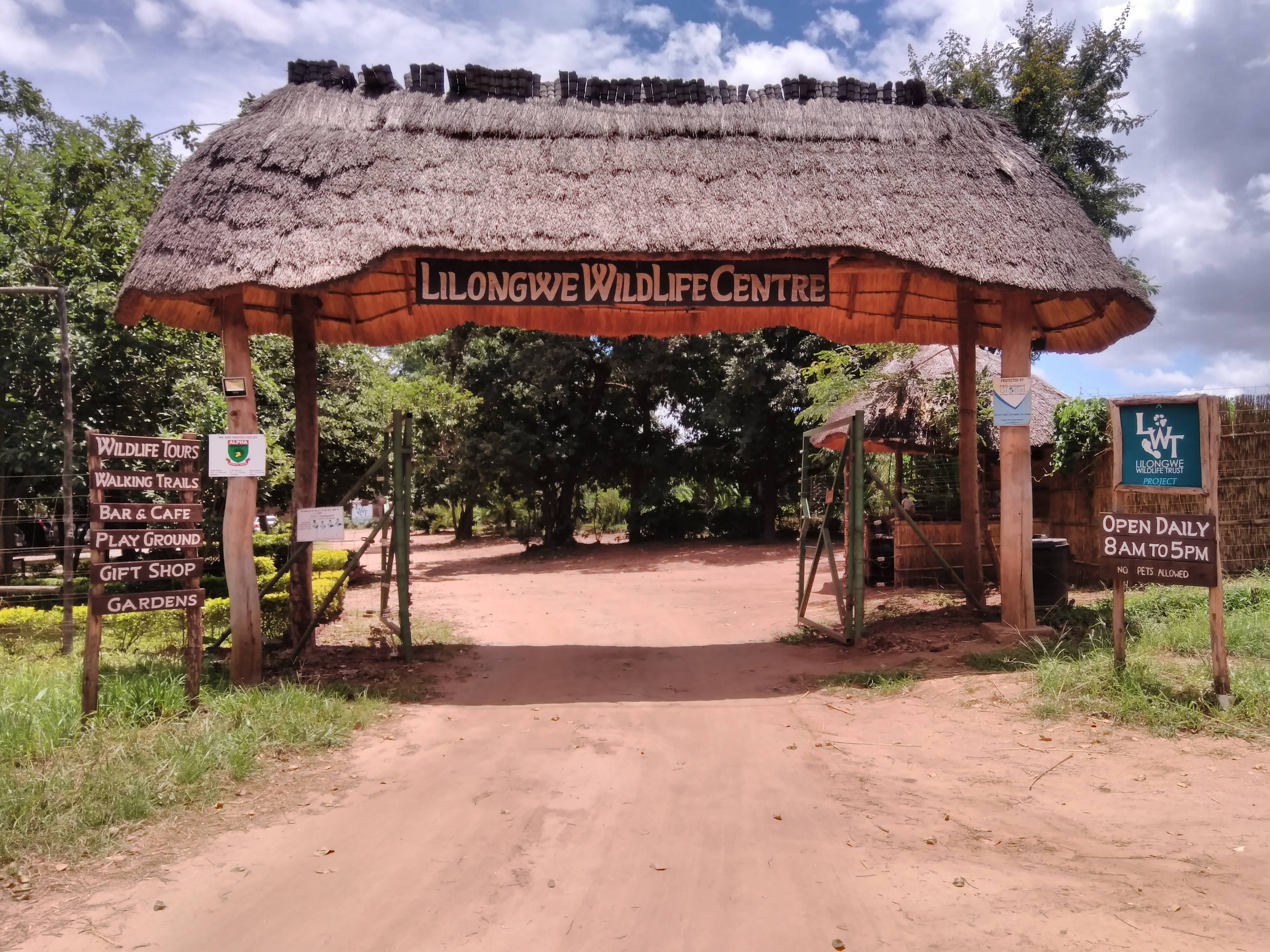
- Entrance
- Founded: 2007
- Type: Charitable Trust
- Registration no.: No.TR/INC4209
- Purpose: Environmentalism, Conservation, Ecology
- Location: Lilongwe, Malawi
- Website: www.lilongwewildlife.org

The Lilongwe Wildlife Centre (Tumbuka: Malo ghakusungilako vinyama ku Lilongwe) is a wildlife sanctuary in Lilongwe, Malawi, which is part of Lilongwe National Park. It was founded in 2007 by the Lilongwe Wildlife Trust (LWT) and the Born Free Foundation. The Centre is a member of the Pan African Sanctuary Alliance (PASA) and the Global Federation of Animal Sanctuaries (GFAS). It is known for its animal rescue work.

== Aims ==
The Lilongwe Wildlife Trust has four main areas of work: wildlife rescue and welfare, education and advocacy, conservation justice, and wildlife research.

The Wildlife Centre is part of the organization's wildlife rescue and welfare branch. It aims to participate in conservation work in Malawi and provide space for wild animals in need. The animals that undergo rehabilitation at the Wildlife Centre are released back into protected areas under controlled and monitored conditions. Additionally, the Wildlife Centre carries out work to promote wildlife conservation and welfare and to support statutory authorities.

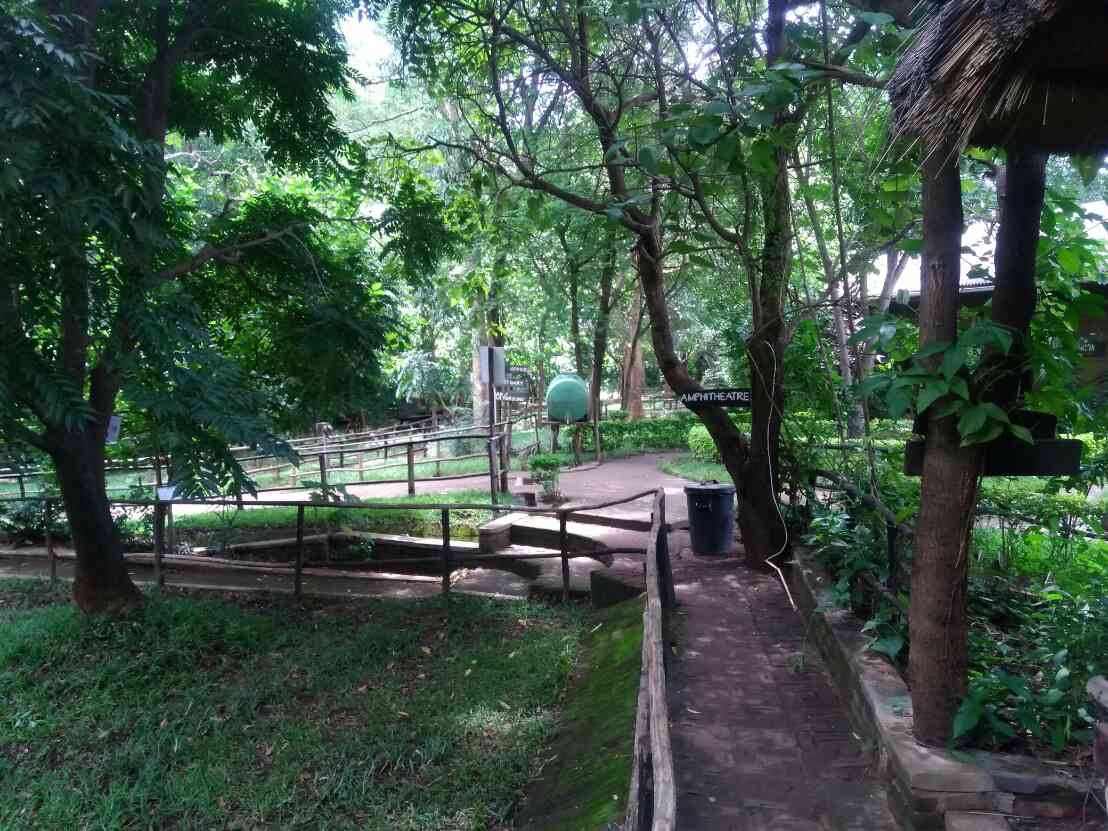
Inside the park

== Wildlife rescue and rehabilitation ==
Lilongwe Wildlife Centre was set up by LWT, with support from the Born Free Foundation, in 2007 as a sanctuary for rehabilitating Malawi's injured, orphaned, and confiscated wildlife. The majority of intakes processed are handled on-site. The Wildlife Centre is currently Malawi's only PASA-accredited wildlife sanctuary. The majority of the Wildlife Centre's intake are rescued as orphans and victims of the illegal pet and bushmeat trade, which is still prevalent in Malawi, or wildlife that has sustained injuries from poaching attempts and human-wildlife conflicts. According to the Born Free Foundation, many rehabilitated animals are released back into the wild or remain at the Wildlife Centre in large natural enclosures. Lilongwe Wildlife Centre is supported by leading animal welfare organizations such as the above-mentioned Born Free Foundation, Stitching AAP, Tusk Trust, International Primate Society, and the International Primate Protection League. In 2011, Lilongwe Wildlife Centre received a Responsible Tourism award for Best Organization for Wildlife Conservation.

Additionally, LWT runs a veterinary Wildlife Emergency Response Unit (WERU), which attends cases around the country that require on-site attention. WERU is a joint initiative between the Malawi Government and LWT.

== Wildlife advocacy and enforcement ==
In 2014, LWT launched a campaign called 'Stop Wildlife Crime - Protect Malawi's Wildlife’ in conjunction with the Malawi Government. It calls for attitudinal and behavioral change, sensitizing the general public, decision-makers, and law enforcement agencies. Their other advocacy and enforcement work includes a lead partner in a toolkit assessment on the nature and status of illegal wildlife trade in Malawi completed on behalf of the Government, partnering with the Government to review and strengthen the National Parks and Wildlife Act of Malawi (NPWA), local NGO representative on the steering committee of the Malawi National Elephant Action Plan, provision of civil society representation to the Inter-Agency Committee on Combating Wildlife Crime (IACCWC) in Malawi, and the principal supporter of proactive wildlife investigations in Malawi.

In 2018, LWT supported the Malawi Government in introducing the country's first wildlife detection dogs at Malawian airports.

LWT is Malawi's sole representative on the Species Survival Network and a founding civil society member of ICCF in Malawi.

== Education and community outreach ==
LWT's Lilongwe Environmental Education Program (LEEP) aims to engage local students by covering topics including wildlife crime, human-wildlife conflict, wildlife welfare, and biodiversity. PEEP, a sister program of LEEP, also educates those living near protected areas in partnership with local NGOs. LWT's community outreach programs include adult literacy, beekeeping, afforestation, permaculture, tree planting, and alternative fuels.

== Wildlife research ==
Lilongwe Wildlife Trust's research work includes wildlife welfare, wildlife management, and conservation medicine. The key projects of Lilongwe Wildlife Trust include urban hyena relocation, adaptation of primates released into the wild, and disease screening for captive wild animals.
