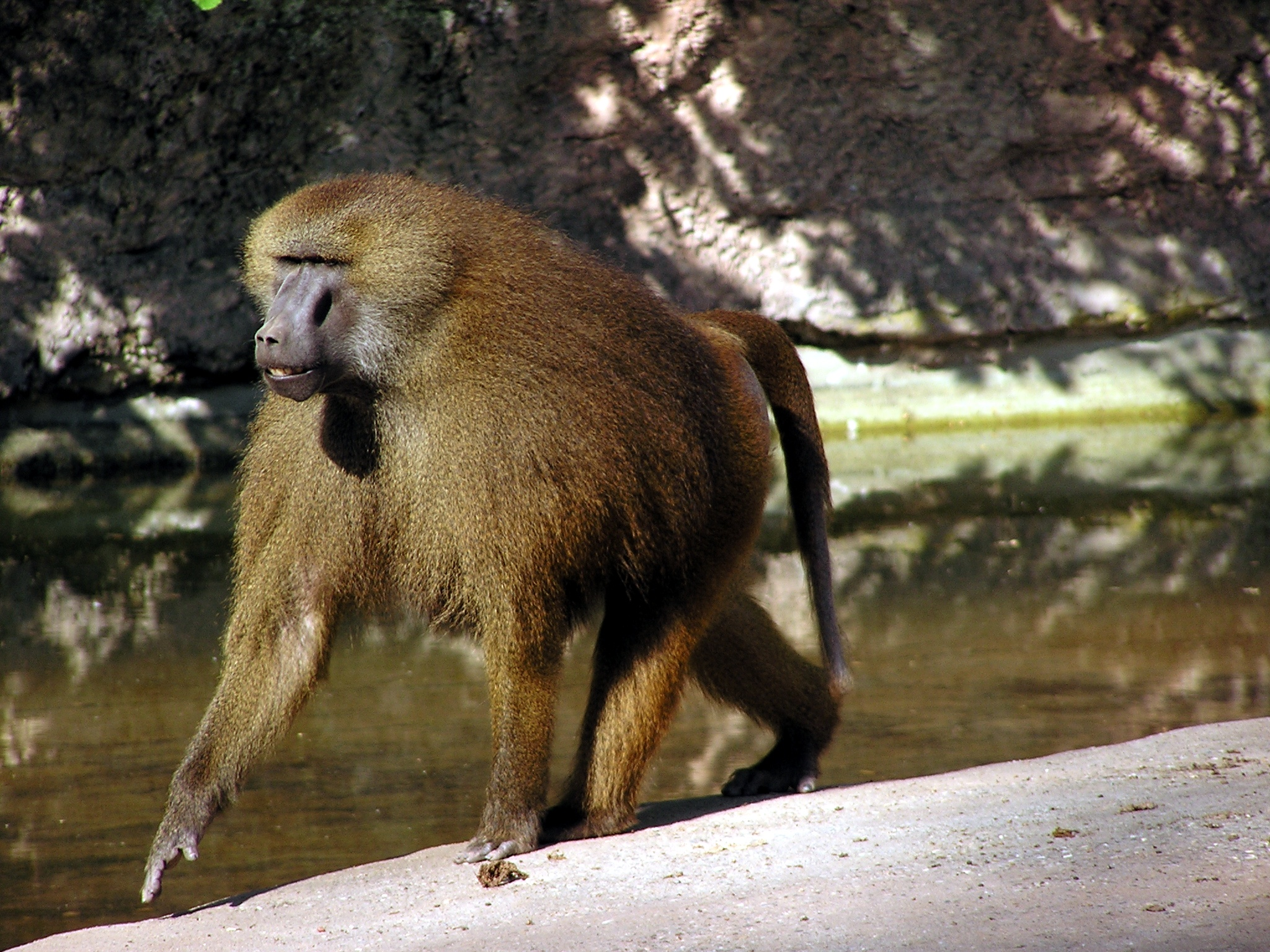
- Male at Nuremberg Zoo
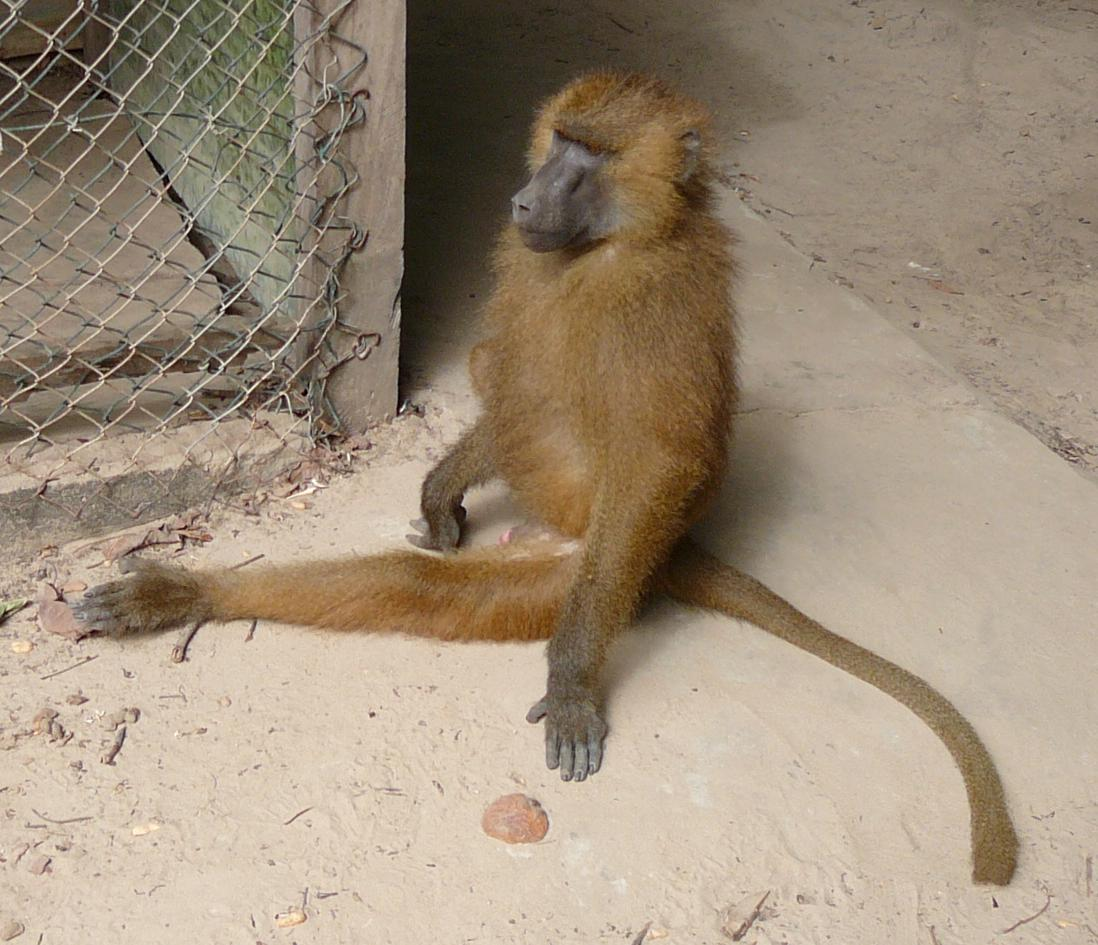
- Female at Abuko Nature Reserve, The Gambia

Conservation status
- Near Threatened (IUCN 3.1)

Scientific classification
- Kingdom: Animalia
- Phylum: Chordata
- Class: Mammalia
- Order: Primates
- Family: Cercopithecidae
- Genus: Papio
- Species: P. papio

Binomial name
- Papio papio (Desmarest, 1820)
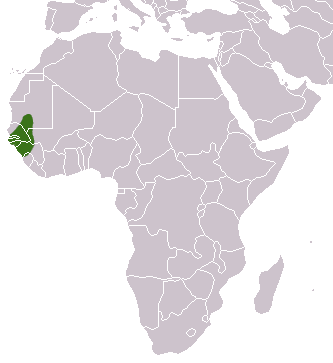
- Guinea baboon range

= Guinea baboon =

Species of Old World monkey

The Guinea baboon (Papio papio) is a baboon from the Old World monkey family. Some (older) classifications list only two species in the genus Papio, this one and the hamadryas baboon. In those classifications, all other Papio species are considered subspecies of P. papio and the species is called the savanna baboon.

The Guinea baboon inhabits a small area in western Africa. Its range includes Guinea, Senegal, Gambia, southern Mauritania and western Mali. Its habitat includes dry forests, gallery forests, and adjoining bush savannas or steppes. It has reddish-brown hair, a hairless, dark-violet or black face with the typical dog-like muzzle, which is surrounded by a small mane, and a tail carried in a round arc. It also has limb modifications that allow it to walk long distances on the ground. The Guinea baboon is one of the smallest baboon species, weighing between 13 and 26 kg (28.6–57 lbs). Their life spans are generally between 20 and 50 years.

It is a diurnal and terrestrial animal, but sleeps in trees or high rocks at night, away from predators. The number of suitable sleeping trees limits the group size and the range. It lives in troops of up to 200 individuals, each with a set place in a hierarchy. Group living provides protection from predators such as the lion and various hyena species. Like all baboons, it is an omnivorous highly opportunistic feeder, eating fruits, buds, roots, bark, grasses, greens, seeds, tubers, leaves, nuts, cereals, insects, worms, birds and small mammals. Because it will eat practically anything available, the Guinea baboon is able to occupy areas with limited resources or harsh conditions. Its presence may help improve habitats because it digs for water and spreads seeds in its waste, encouraging plant growth.

The Guinea baboon is a highly communicative animal. It communicates by using a variety of vocalizations and physical interactions. In addition to vocalizations to each other, this animal has vocal communications apparently intended to be received and interpreted by predators.

Due to its small range and the loss of its habitat, the Guinea baboon is classified as "near threatened" by the IUCN.

== Physical description ==
Baboon refers to the large-bodied primates with marked sexual dimorphism and having females and young that are dependent on males for protection. Guinean baboons have a red tone to their fur, and are sometimes referred to as the red baboon. They lack hair on their hindquarters, and their faces are black with yellow-brown sideburns. Females' rumps are pink in color and males have a mane of fur around their heads and shoulders. A characteristic feature of baboons is their long molars and broad incisors. The long canines are evidence of sexual dimorphism in baboon species. Their forelimbs and hindlimbs are nearly equal in length and their digits on their hands and feet are relatively short and stout, making it difficult for them to climb.

Baboons are one of the largest groups of monkeys and are sexually dimorphic in body size (meaning the males and females have differing body sizes). They can range in weight from 13 and 26 kg (28–57 lbs), making them among the smallest of the baboon species.

== Habitat and distribution ==
Generally found in woodland savannas, Guinea baboons seasonally congregate near permanent water sources, breaking off in the wet season into smaller groups. Although baboon species are all allopatric, some of their ranges do overlap, and interbreeding does occasionally occur. These baboons are found in a wide range across Africa in savannah habitats including Guinea, Senegal, Gambia, southern Mauritania and western Mali. Most typically they are in the savannah and forests of sub-Saharan Africa. They can also be found in grasslands, rain forests, and other open areas.

== Ecology ==
Guinea baboons are diurnal, living on the ground instead of in trees, and typically sleep in trees at the terminal ends of branches. Their group size is widely variable and ranges from 30 to 200. However, the most common troop size is 30–40 individuals. Often, a pronounced male hierarchy and fierce competition for females happens within the group. This competition leads to sexual dimorphism among the species. When it comes to feeding, they are independent foragers, and females are always paired with males when foraging so they can be protected. Females may choose to follow the same males from year to year.

=== Diet ===
Like other baboon species, Guinea baboons will eat any available foods, but their main sources are fruits, roots, tubers, grass, seeds and leaves. They also will eat insects, worms, spiders, small mammals, birds and invertebrates.

== Behavior ==
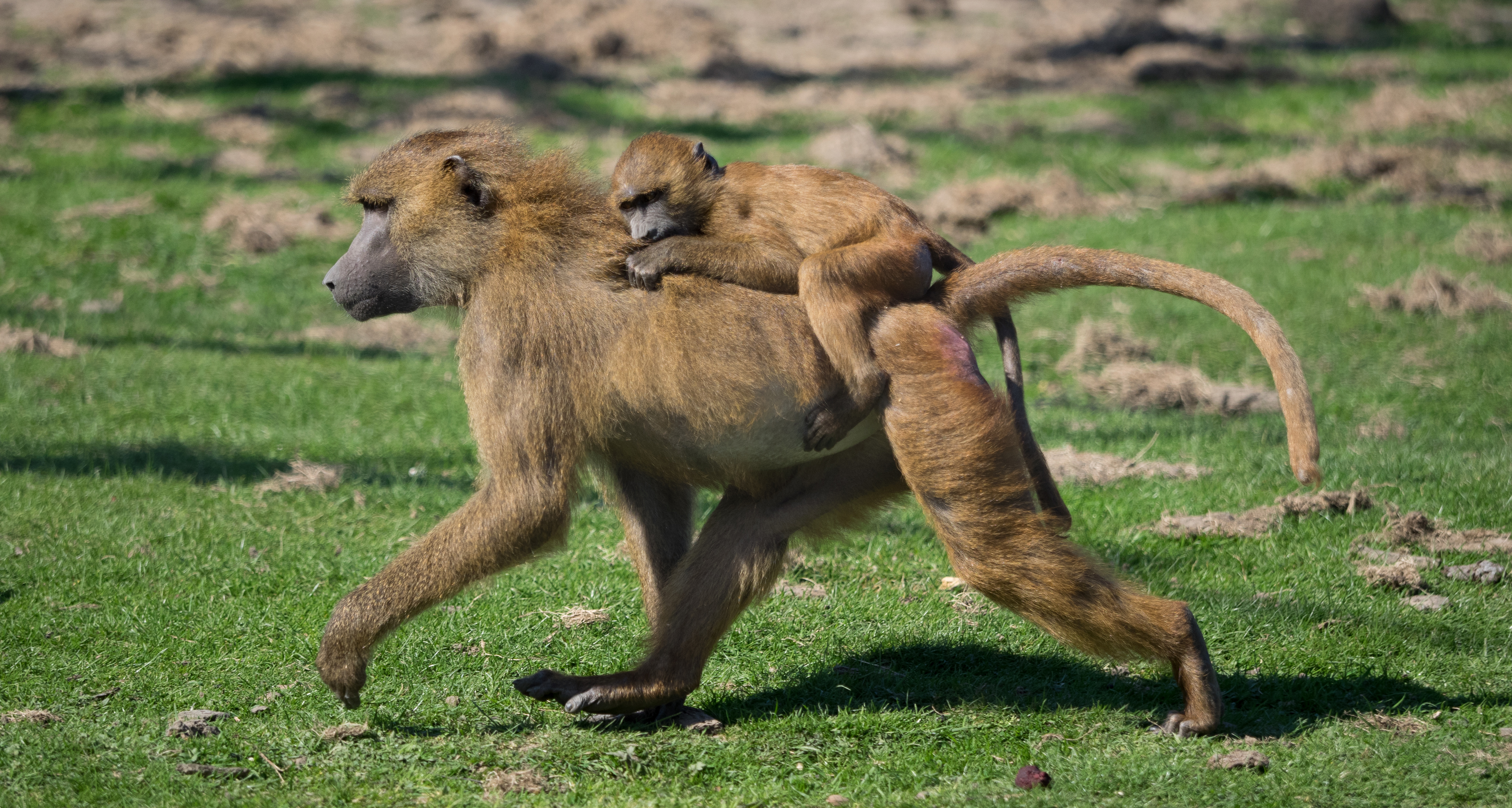
Female and juvenile at Port Lympne Wild Animal Park

Socially, Guinea baboons have more in common with Hamadryas baboons than other baboon species, living in one male units, consisting of one dominant male, several females and juveniles, and often a follower male. These groups are usually small, but join with larger groups to form a troop; these groups sleep or forage together. The Guinean troops are large multiple-male, multiple-female troops with 50–300 baboons. The harems consist of two to five females which mate with the dominant male. However, despite their similarities, Guinea baboon social behaviour has a few noticeable differences from that of Hamadryas baboons. Male guinea baboons are not as rigidly dominant as hamadryas baboon males, and unlike female Hamadryas baboons, female guinea baboons exert a more active role in leading the group. Males are also unusually tolerant of one another, and there is very little aggression in this species. Unusually for baboons (and old world monkeys in general), Guinea baboons also share food. Guinea baboon troops are very fluid in their structure, as female guinea baboons sometimes spend lengthy periods of time away from males in temporary, all-female groups, and several males may gather together and cooperate with one another with little bickering. This flexibility has led some to compare guinea baboon behaviour to that of early human ancestors.

Males frequently use reconciliation gestures to reduce male-male aggression and encourage cooperation, allowing troops to grow to large size and adapt to different circumstances. While male Hamadryas baboons forcibly acquire females for their harems by kidnapping them and utilizing neck-bites to condition them to stay near, female guinea baboons select males at their own leisure, males typically using facial expressions and gestures to guide their movement and grooming them to win over their loyalty. In Guinea baboons, Harem masters are noticeably less strict with their female consorts than Hamadryas baboon harem masters. Female Guinea baboons not only fraternize with females from other harems but even other males without being reprimanded by their male consort. Females approach males to initiate mating behaviour as they please and even mate with more than one male (although they mate with the harem master the most), a far cry from the more "faithful" female Hamadryas baboons. As seen in chimpanzees, olive baboons and various macaque species, this promiscuity most likely is practiced to hide the paternity of their infants as a counter strategy against male infanticide, which occurs in Hamadryas baboons but has not yet been observed in Guinea baboons (although male Guinea baboons have been observed temporarily kidnapping and then returning infants). Competition for females between males is noticeably reduced or absent.

Unlike Hamadryas baboons and some other species, Guinea baboons are not very good climbers and favor trees, rather than high rocks or cliffs for sleeping. The more dominant males sleep on the heavier, thicker branches near the trunk of the tree and lower ranking members and juveniles sleep on the smaller and weaker branches further from the trunk. During daylight hours, they spend the majority of their time foraging on the ground, running along in quadrupedal patterns.

=== Communication ===
The Guinea baboons have a host of vocal, visual, and tactile communications. Their several vocal calls each convey several different messages, and consist of predator warnings, signaling friendly intentions, submissive calls, and anger or frustration vocalizations. Many of these calls can be used in combination with either each other or with some other form of visual or tactile communication. Visual communications serve many of the same purposes as the vocal calls, and are often accompanied by some sort of vocal call. Lower ranking animals appease more dominant ones with an "ack ack" vocalization and "wahoo" alarm calls are uttered if a threat presents itself. Tactile communication is usually tied to visual communication and can range from mouth-to-mouth touching to biting or slapping. Male Guinea baboons are unlike other baboon species, as they form intimate friendships with other males, fondling each other's genitals as a gesture of greeting, as well as mounting each other and huddling together.

=== Reproduction ===
Female Guinea baboons exhibit sexual swelling that begins about 10 to 12 days before it peaks and remains consistent for about eight days afterwards. Females then participate in the social behavior of presenting, which is when she signals to the males in the group she is ready for copulation.

The mean gestation period is about six months and nursing continues until about six to eight months. Females rebuff a male's advances by shrieking at him and often climbing up a tree.

== Predation ==
In Fongoli, Senegal, male Western chimpanzees are observed to prey more on Guinea baboons.
