= Hepatocystis vassali =

Scientific classification
- Domain: Eukaryota
- Clade: Diaphoretickes
- Clade: SAR
- Clade: Alveolata
- Phylum: Apicomplexa
- Class: Aconoidasida
- Order: Haemospororida
- Family: Plasmodiidae
- Genus: Hepatocystis
- Species: H. vassali

Binomial name
- Hepatocystis vassali Laveran, 1905

Species of single-celled organism

Hepatocystis vassali is a species of parasitic protozoa that infect mammals.

== Taxonomy ==
The parasite was first described by Laveran in 1905.

== Hosts ==
The only known host is the red-bellied squirrel (Callosciurus flavimanus).
