= Hepatocystis pteropi =

Scientific classification
- Domain: Eukaryota
- Clade: Diaphoretickes
- Clade: SAR
- Clade: Alveolata
- Phylum: Apicomplexa
- Class: Aconoidasida
- Order: Haemospororida
- Family: Plasmodiidae
- Genus: Hepatocystis
- Species: H. pteropi

Binomial name
- Hepatocystis pteropi (Breinl, 1913)

Synonyms
- Plasmodium pteropi Breinl, 1913

Species of single-celled organism

Hepatocystis pteropi is a species of parasitic protozoa. The vertebrate hosts are mammals.

== Hosts ==
This species was described by Breinl in 1913 in the black flying fox (Pteropus gouldii). It has also been found in Pteropus conspicillatus, and Pteropus scapulatus.

== Distribution ==
The species has been found in Asia and Australia.
