= Hepatocystis muuli =

Scientific classification
- Domain: Eukaryota
- Clade: Sar
- Clade: Alveolata
- Phylum: Apicomplexa
- Class: Aconoidasida
- Order: Haemospororida
- Family: Plasmodiidae
- Genus: Hepatocystis
- Species: H. muuli

Binomial name
- Hepatocystis muuli Mialhe and Landau, 1977

Species of single-celled organism

Hepatocystis muuli is a species of parasitic protozoa. They are transmitted by flies of the genus Culicoides and infect mammals.

== Taxonomy ==
This species was described in 1977 by Landau et al.

== Description ==
The schizonts are intrahepatocytic and provoke an hypertrophy of the host cell and its nucleus which remain visible during the entire development of the tissue stage. Schizonts as they mature become very lobulated with abundant colloid which is irregularly distributed. They may reach a maximum size of 350 micrometres. Histiomacrophagic reaction of the surrounding tissue remains moderate before the maturity of the parasite.

Gametocytes are abundant and many erythrocytes are parasitized by immature forms. The mature gametocytes measure 7.7 to 9.3 (average 8.5) micrometres in diameter and are easily deformed.

The microgametocytes have a diffuse nucleus. The macrogametocytes are lightly pigmented and have a large nucleus.

The size of the schizonts, their lobulated form and the hypertrophy of the host cell distinguish H. muuli from other Asian Hepatocystis species.

== Distribution ==
This species is found in Kanchanaburi, Thailand.

== Hosts ==
This species infects Berdmore's ground squirrel (Menetes berdmorei).
