= Hepatocystis hipposideri =

Scientific classification
- Domain: Eukaryota
- Clade: Sar
- Clade: Alveolata
- Phylum: Apicomplexa
- Class: Aconoidasida
- Order: Haemospororida
- Family: Plasmodiidae
- Genus: Hepatocystis
- Species: H. hipposideri

Binomial name
- Hepatocystis hipposideri Manwell and Kuntz, 1977

Species of single-celled organism

Hepatocystis hipposideri is a species of parasitic protozoa. They are transmitted by flies of the genus Culicoides and infect mammals.

== Taxonomy ==
This species was described in 1966 by Manwell and Kuntz.

== Distribution ==
This species is found in Taiwan.

== Hosts ==
This species infects the large leafnosed bat (Hipposideros armiger terasensis).
