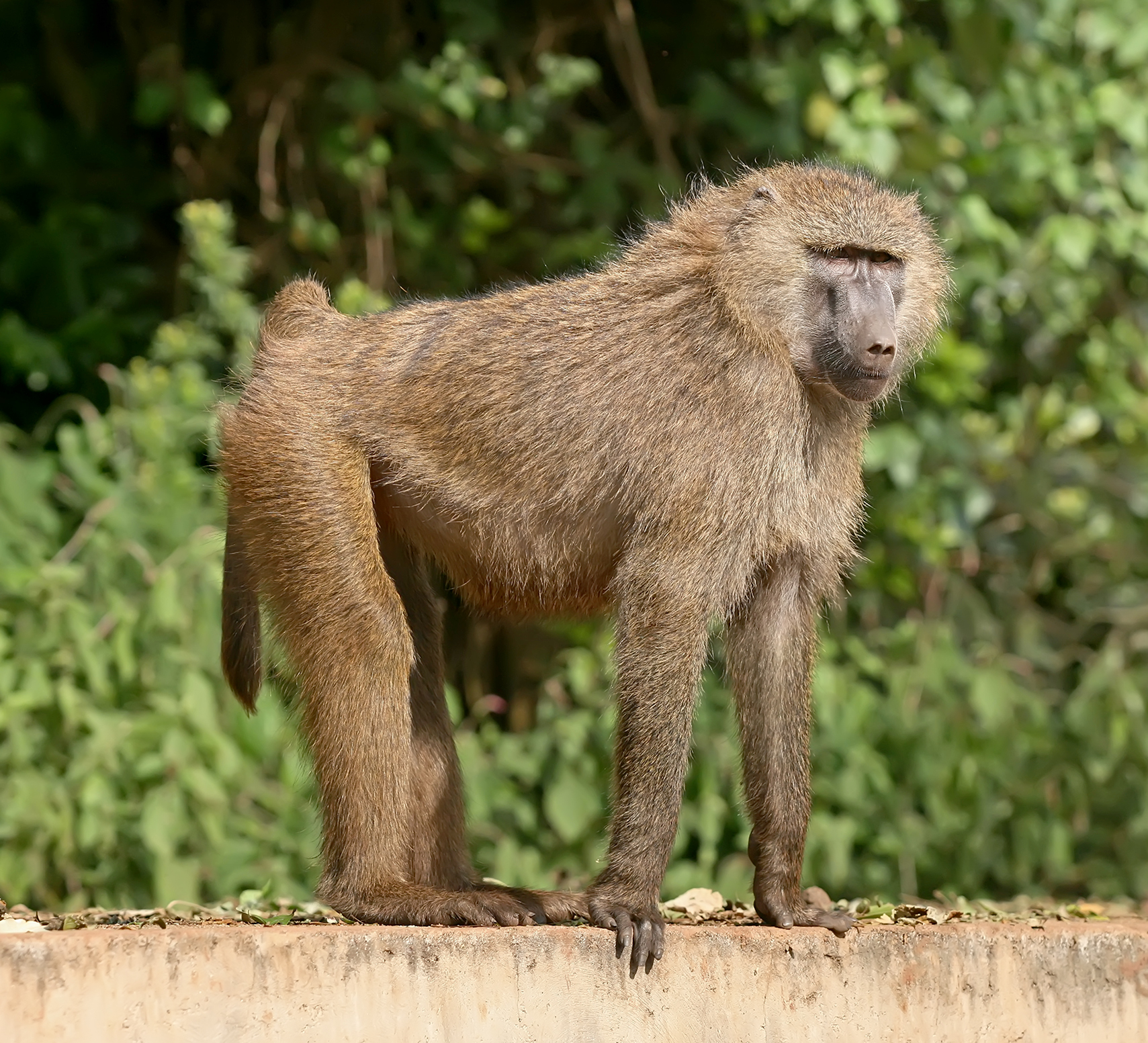
- In the Ngorongoro Conservation Area, Tanzania

Conservation status
- Least Concern (IUCN 3.1)
- CITES Appendix II

Scientific classification
- Kingdom: Animalia
- Phylum: Chordata
- Class: Mammalia
- Order: Primates
- Family: Cercopithecidae
- Genus: Papio
- Species: P. anubis

Binomial name
- Papio anubis (Lesson, 1827)
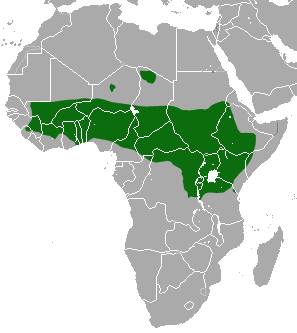
- Geographic range

= Olive baboon =

Species of Old World monkey

The olive baboon (Papio anubis), also called the Anubis baboon, is a member of the family Cercopithecidae Old World monkeys. The species is the most wide-ranging of all baboons, being native to 25 countries throughout Africa, extending from Mali eastward to Ethiopia and Tanzania. Isolated populations are also present in some mountainous regions of the Sahara. It inhabits savannahs, steppes, and forests. The common name is derived from its coat colour, which is a shade of green-grey at a distance. A variety of communications, vocal and non-vocal, facilitate a complex social structure.

== Characteristics ==
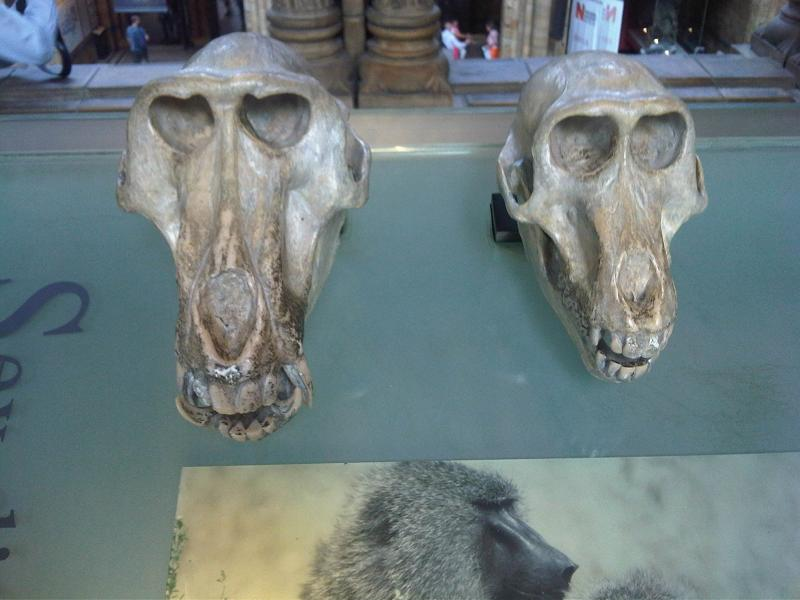
Skulls of a male (left) and female (right)

The olive baboon is named for its coat, which, at a distance, is a shade of green-grey. At closer range, its coat is multicoloured, due to rings of yellow-brown and black on the hairs. The hair on the baboon's face is coarser and ranges from dark grey to black. This coloration is shared by both sexes, although males have a mane of longer hair that tapers down to ordinary length along the back.

Besides the mane, the male olive baboon differs from the female in terms of weight, body and canine tooth size; males are, on average, 70 cm (28 in) tall while standing and females measure 60 cm (24 in) in height. The olive baboon is one of the largest species of monkey; along with chacma baboons, mandrills, and muriquis. The head-and-body length can range from 50 to 114 cm (20 to 45 in), with a species average of around 85 cm (33 in). At the shoulder on all fours, females average 55 cm (22 in) against males, which average 70 cm (28 in). The typical weight range for both sexes is reportedly 10–37 kg (22–82 lb), with males averaging 24 kg (53 lb) and females averaging 14.7 kg (32 lb). Some males may weigh as much as 50 kg (110 lb).

Like other baboons, the olive baboon has an elongated, dog-like muzzle. Its 38 to 58 cm (15 to 23 in) long tail and four-legged gait can make it seem canine. The tail almost looks as if it is broken, as it is erect for the first quarter, after which it drops down sharply. The bare patch of a baboon's rump is smaller in the olive baboon than in the Hamadryas baboon or Guinea baboon. The olive baboon, like most cercopithecines, has a cheek pouch with which to store food.

== Distribution and habitat ==
The olive baboon inhabits a strip of 25 equatorial African countries, very nearly ranging from the east to west coasts of the continent. The exact boundaries of this strip are not clearly defined, as its range overlaps with that of other baboon species, which has resulted in cross-breeding between species in many places. For example, considerable hybridisation has occurred between the olive baboon and the hamadryas baboon in Ethiopia. Cross-breeding with the yellow baboon and the Guinea baboon has also been observed, but the hybrids have not as yet been well studied.

Throughout its wide range, the olive baboon occurs in a number of different habitats. It is usually classified as savannah-dwelling, living in the wide plains of the grasslands. The grasslands, especially those near open woodland, make up a large part of its habitat, but it also inhabits rainforests and deserts. Uganda and the Democratic Republic of the Congo support olive baboon populations in dense tropical forests.

A small introduced population was present in the Province of Cádiz and possibly in the Province of Málaga in Spain. It is considered extinct in Spain.

== Behaviour and ecology ==
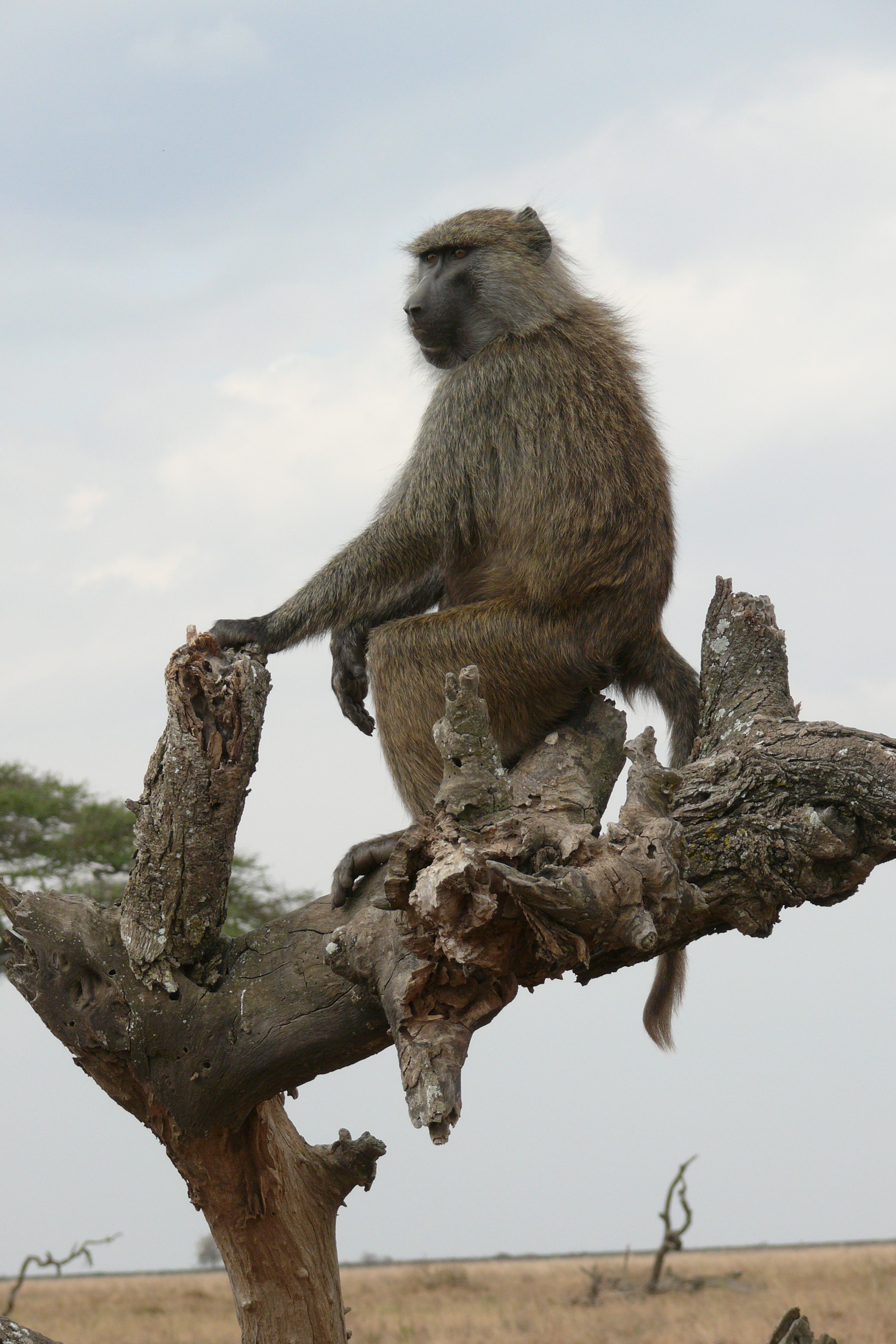
By climbing trees, individuals can act as a lookout to detect predators.

=== Social structure ===
The olive baboon lives in groups of 15 to 150, made up of a few males, many females, and their young. Female social rank is determined largely by heredity, with daughters inheriting their rank in line with their mother's, and adult females forming the core of the social system. Female relatives form their own subgroups in the troop. Related females are largely friendly to each other. They tend to stay close together and groom one another, and team up in aggressive encounters within the troop. Female kin form these strong bonds because they do not emigrate from their natal groups.

Occasionally, groups may split up when they become so large that competition for resources is problematic, but even then, members of matrilines tend to stick together. Dominant females procure more food, matings, and supporters. Among olive baboons in Tanzania, high-ranking females give birth at shorter intervals to infants with a higher survival rate, and their daughters tend to mature faster than low-ranking females. These high-ranking females also appear to have a higher probability of miscarriages and some high-ranking matrilines have inexplicably low fertility. One theory suggests this occurs due to stress on the high-ranking females, although this theory is controversial. A recent study shows top-ranking females are at risk from male harassment. Males who have recently immigrated harass females in order to induce miscarriages in females they had not yet mated with, in order to impregnate them with an offspring that is his own faster. As females with living infants often have male allies protecting their infants, it makes more sense for a male to ignore infants and channel his aggression to the group's resident pregnant females who do not currently have infants instead.

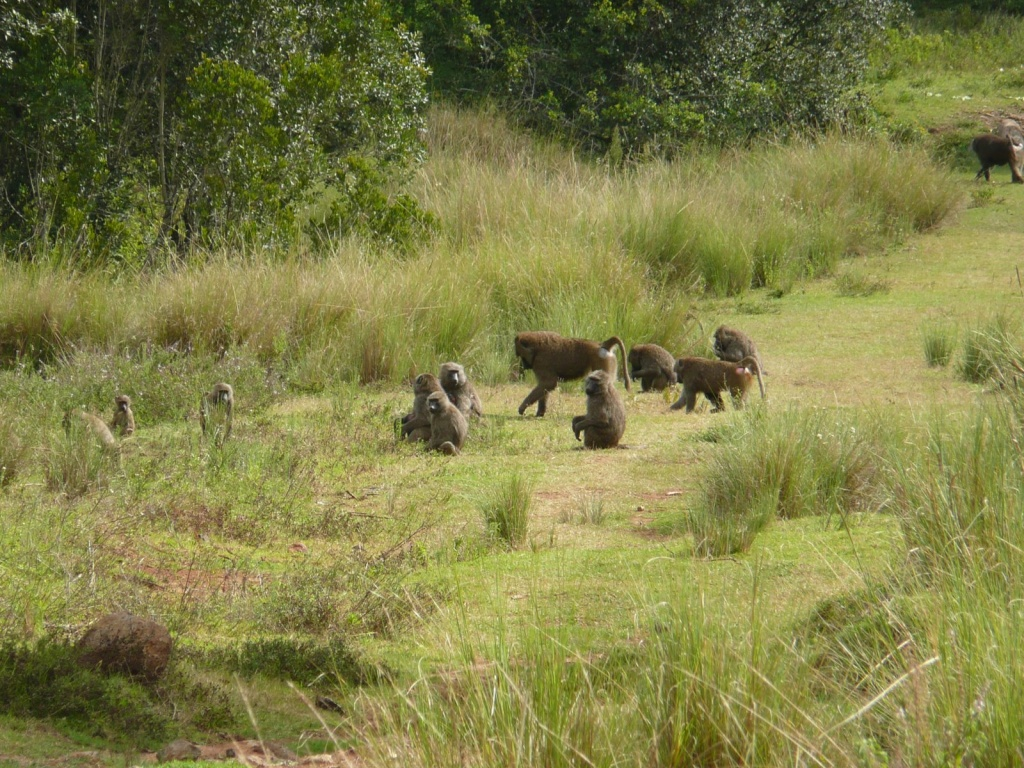
Troop in Kenya

A female often forms a long-lasting social relationship with a male in her troop, known as a "friendship". These nonsexual affiliative friendships benefit both the male and female. Males benefit from these relationships because they are usually formed soon after he immigrates into a new group, and helps the male integrate into the group more easily. He could also potentially end up mating with his female friend in the future. Females gain protection from threats to themselves and their infants (if they have any). Males occasionally "baby-sit" for their female friends, so she can feed and forage freely without the burden of having to carry or watch the infant. Sexually receptive females and newly immigrated males can form such friendships. These relationships are sometimes enduring and the pair grooms and remains close to each other. They also travel, forage, sleep, and raise infants together, as well as fight together against aggressive conspecifics.

Females with high social ranks even forge friendships with multiple males at once. Another advantage of these friendships is it enables females to gain protection from the unwanted advances of males aiming to mate with them. A female who finds a male undesirable can simply rebuff his advances by calling on her male friends to chase him away, and can therefore enjoy exerting her reproductive skew. While infanticide is a reproductive strategy in males, it is costly for females, which would also explain why infanticide is a rare occurrence in olive baboons yet can be the principal cause of infant mortality in many other baboon subspecies: high-ranking females can simply rebuff a male threatening her infant, making infant-targeted aggression a reproductive disadvantage in olive baboons. This also explains the reason male olive baboons use infants as shields in aggressive encounters.

Males establish their dominance more forcefully than females. A male disperses, or leaves his natal group and joins another group, after reaching sexual maturity. Adult males are very competitive with each other and fight for access to females. Higher dominance means better access to mating and earlier access to food, so naturally a great deal of fighting over rank occurs, with younger males constantly trying to rise in position. Because females stay with their groups their entire lives, and males emigrate to others, often a new male challenges an older one for dominance. Frequently, when older baboons drop in the social hierarchy, they move to another tribe. The younger males who pushed them down often bully and harass them. Older males tend to have more supportive and equal relationships than those of the younger males. The former may form coalitions against the latter.

Despite being hierarchical, baboons appear to be "democratic" when it comes to deciding the direction of collective movement. Individuals are more likely to follow when multiple decision-makers agree on what direction to go rather than simply following dominant individuals.

=== Reproduction and parenting ===
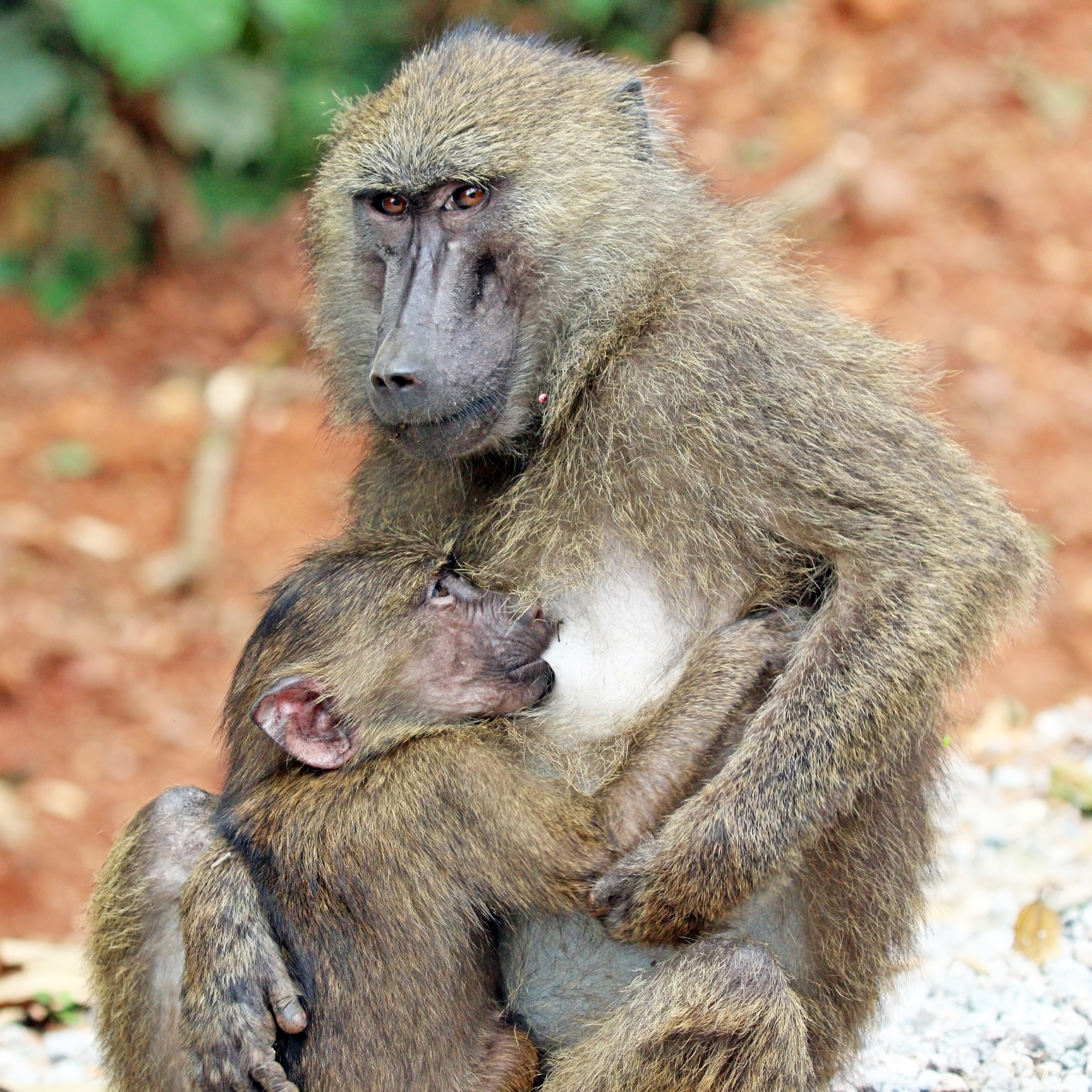
Female with suckling young

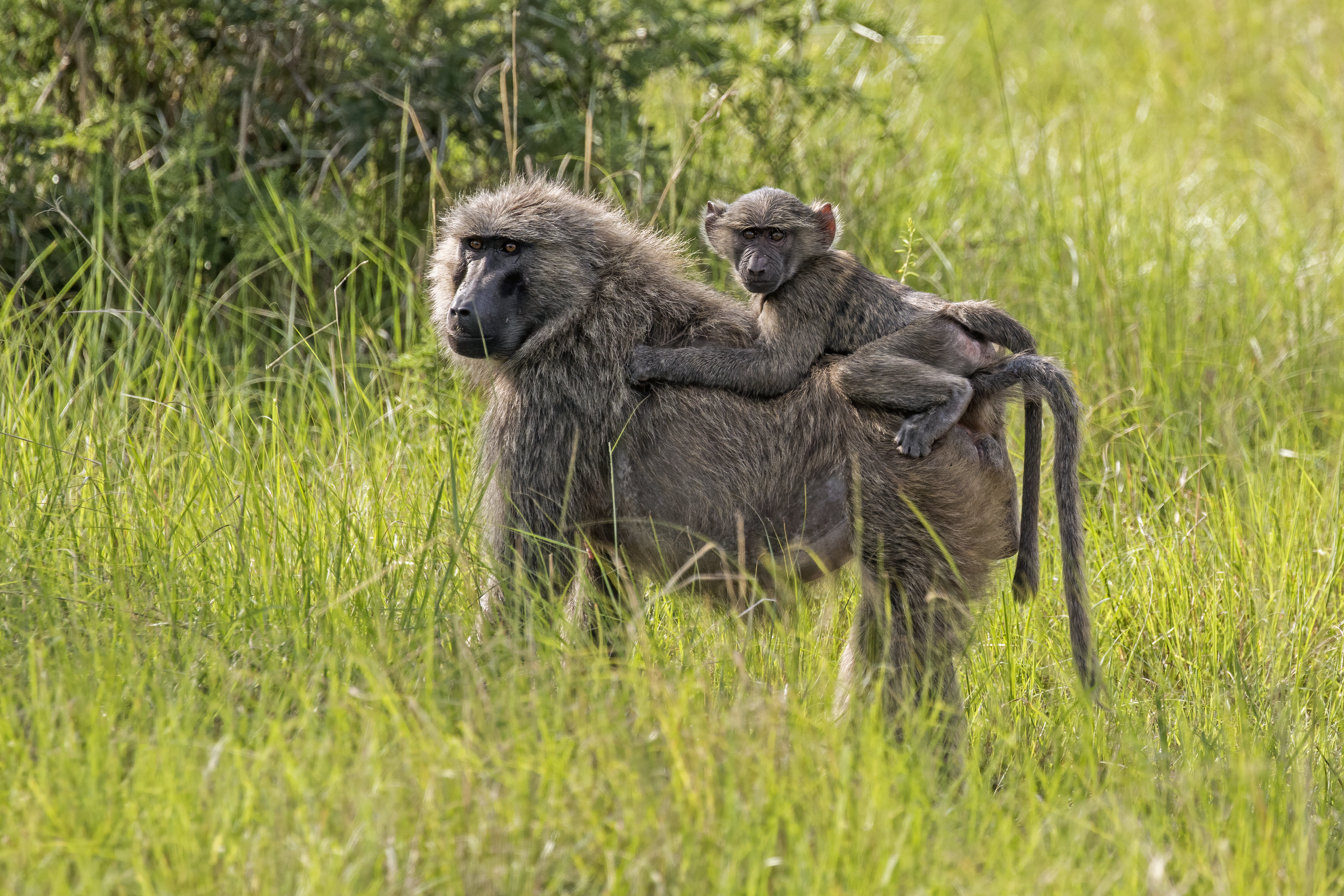
Female with baby in Queen Elizabeth National Park, Uganda

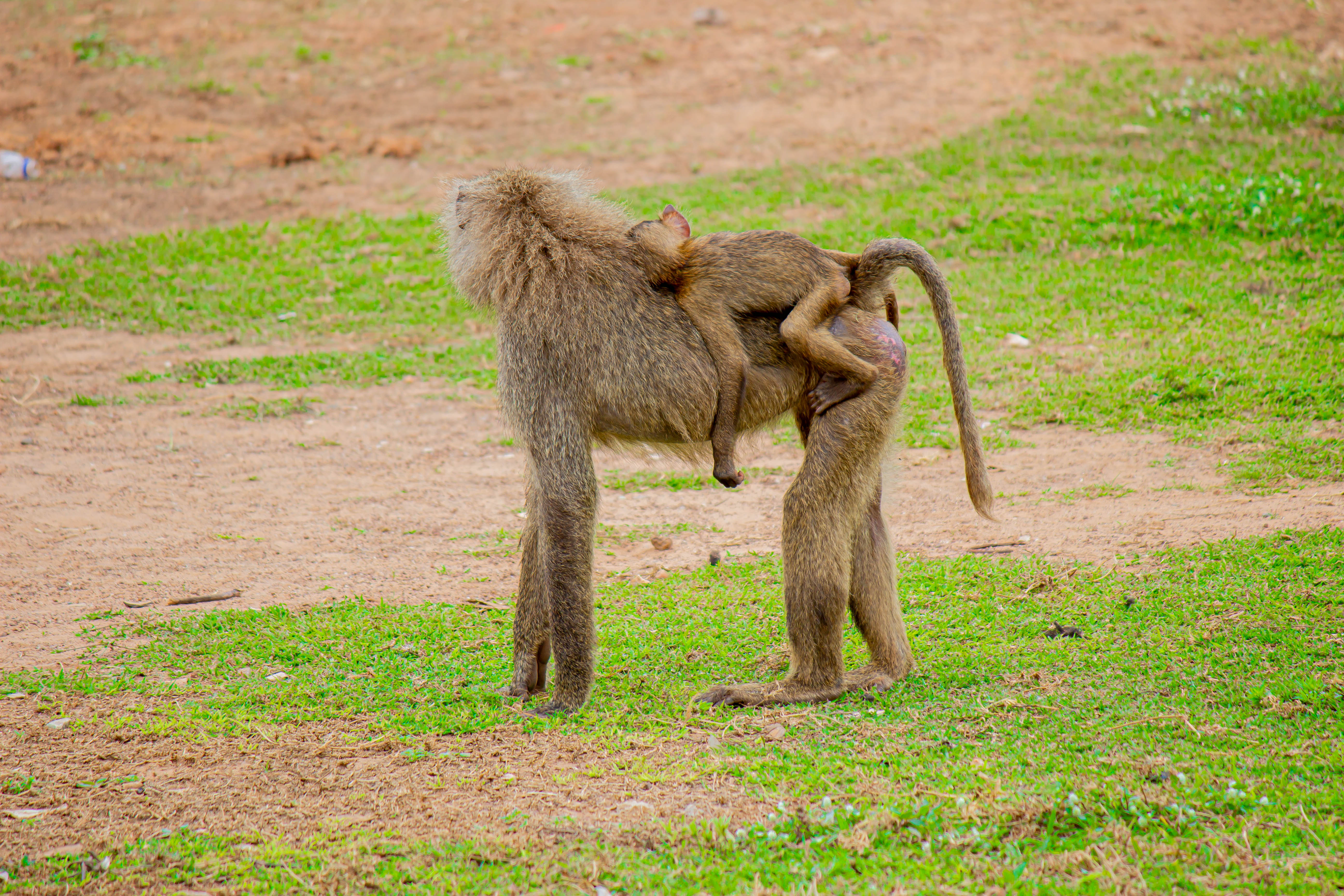
Olive baboon carrying a juvenile on her back at Mole National Park in Ghana

Females are sexually mature at seven to eight years old, and males at seven to 10 years. The beginning of a female's ovulation is a signal to the males that she is ready to mate. During ovulation, the skin of the female's anogenital area swells and turns a bright red/pink. The swelling makes it difficult to move and increases the female's chance of microbial or parasitic infection. Females with more swollen anogenital areas reproduce while younger, produce more offspring per year, and those offspring have a better chance of surviving. These females also attract more males, and are more likely to cause aggressive fights between them. Olive baboons tend to mate promiscuously. A male forms a mating consortship with an estrous female, staying close to and copulating with her. Males guard their partner against any other male trying to mate with her. Unless a female is in a multiday consortship, she often copulates with more than one male each day. Multiple copulations are not necessary for reproduction, but may function to make the actual paternity of the female's offspring ambiguous. This lack of paternal certainty could help reduce the occurrence of infanticide. Occasionally, male olive baboons monopolize a female for her entire period of probable conception. The male protects his female from being mated by other males during consortship.

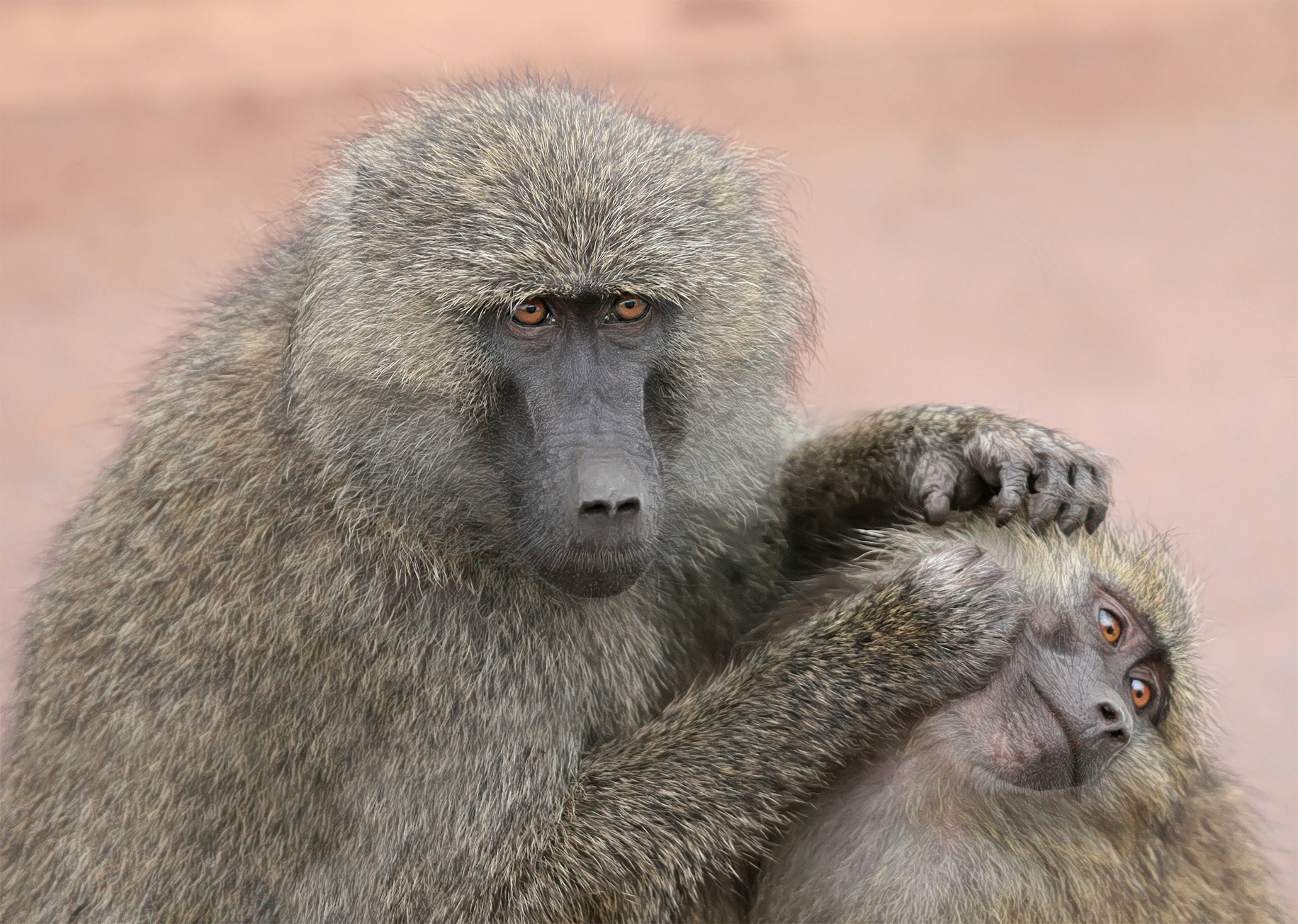
Adult grooming young in the Ngorongoro Conservation Area

Newborns have black natal coats and bright pink skin. Females are the primary caregivers of infants, but males also play a role. In its first few days, the infant may be unable to stay attached to its mother and relies on her for physical support. Its grasp grows stronger by its first week and it is able to cling to its mother's fur by itself. By two weeks, the infant begins to explore its surroundings for short periods, but stays near her. The distance the infant spends away from its mother increases the older it gets. In general, higher-ranking females are usually more relaxed parents than females of lower rank, which usually keep their offspring close to them. This difference lasts for approximately the first eight weeks of an infant's life. Olive baboons do not seem to practise co-operative parenting, but a female may groom an infant that is not hers. Subadult and juvenile females are more likely to care for another's young, as they have not yet produced offspring of their own. One theory for why immature females tend to seek out infants is that they can prepare for their future roles as mothers. Infant baboons born to first-time mothers suffer higher mortality than those born to experienced mothers, which suggests that prior experience in caring for infants is important. Adult males in the groups also care for the infants, as they are likely to be related to them. Males groom infants, reducing the amount of parasites they may have, and calm them when they are stressed. They may also protect them from predators, such as chimpanzees. Adult males exploit infants and often use them as shields to reduce the likelihood that other males will threaten them.

=== Communication ===
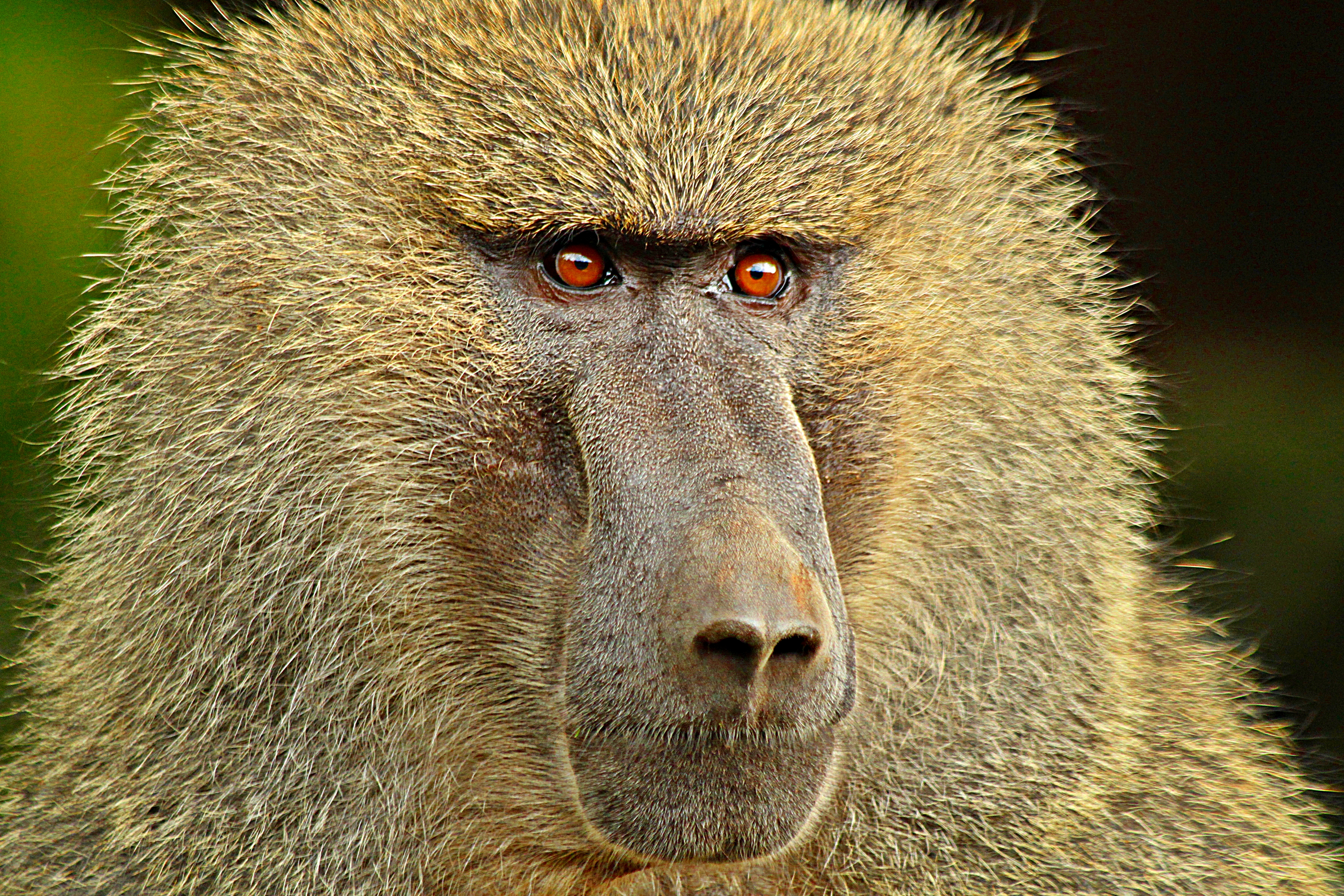
Face of an olive baboon

Olive baboons communicate with various vocalizations and facial expressions. Throughout the day, baboons of all ages emit the "basic grunt". Adults give a range of calls. The "roargrunt" is made by adult males displaying to each other. The "cough-bark", and the "cough geck" are made when low-flying birds or humans they do not know are sighted. A "wa-hoo" call is made in response to predators or neighbouring groups at night and during stressful situations. Other vocalizations include "broken grunting" (low-volume, quick series of grunts made during relatively calm aggressive encounters), "pant-grunts" (made when aggressive encounters escalate), "shrill barks" (loud calls given when potential threats appear suddenly), and "screams" (continuous high-pitch sounds responding to strong emotions). The most common facial expression of the olive baboon is "lipsmacking", which is associated with a number of behaviours. "Ear flattening", "eyes narrowed", "head shaking", "jaw-clapping", lipsmacking, and "tongue protrusion" are used when baboons are greeting each other, and are sometimes made with a "rear present". "Eyebrow raising", "molar grinding", "staring", and "yawning" are used to threaten other baboons. A submissive baboon responds with displays such as the "fear grin", the "rigid crouch", and "tail erect".

=== Diet ===
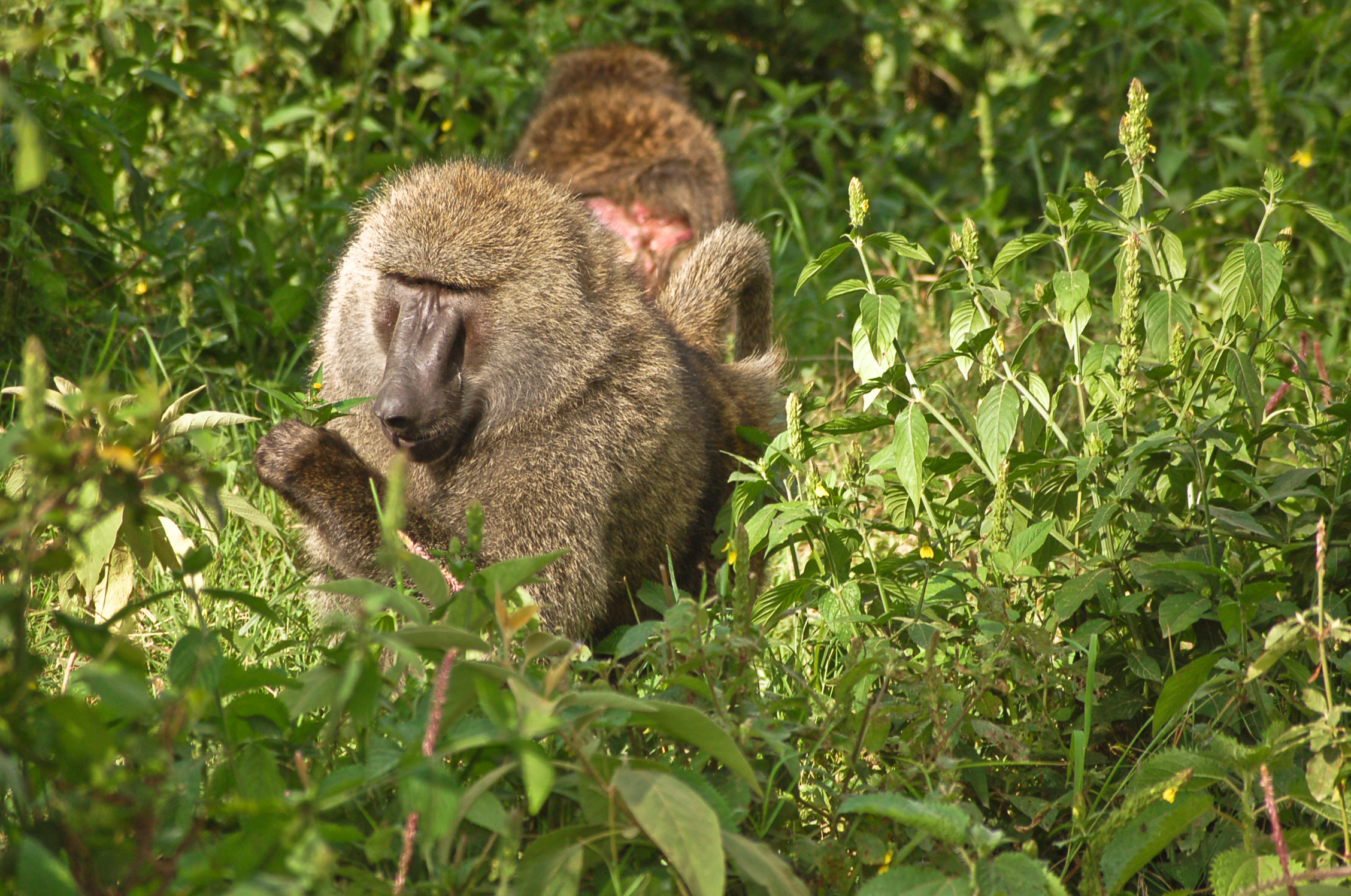
Foraging in Kenya

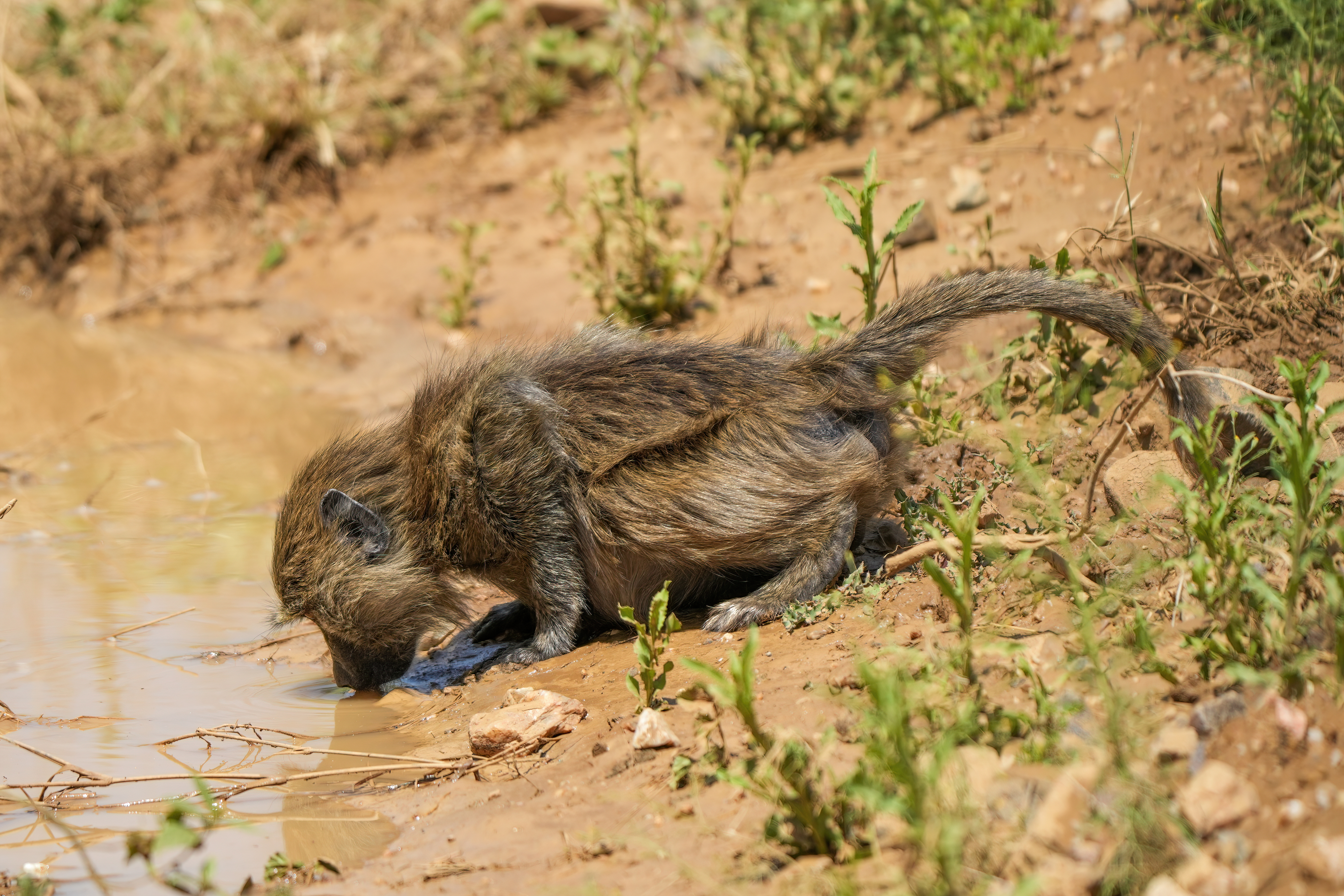
Juvenile olive baboon drinking water in the Serengeti National Park, Tanzania

One major reason for its widespread success is that the olive baboon is omnivorous and like other baboons, will eat practically anything. As such, it is able to find nutrition in almost any environment and is able to adapt with different foraging tactics. For instance, the olive baboon in grassland goes about finding food differently from one in a forest. The baboon forages on all levels of an environment, above and beneath the ground and in the canopy of forests. Most animals only look for food at one level; an arboreal species such as a lemur does not look for food on the ground. The olive baboon searches as wide an area as it can, and it eats virtually everything it finds.

The diet typically includes a large variety of plants, and invertebrates and small mammals, as well as birds. The olive baboon eats leaves, grass, roots, bark, flowers, fruit, lichens, tubers, seeds, mushrooms, corms, and rhizomes. Corms and rhizomes are especially important in times of drought, because grass loses a great deal of its nutritional value. In dry, arid regions, such as the northeastern deserts, small invertebrates like insects, grubs, worms, spiders, and scorpions fill out its diet.

The olive baboon also actively hunts prey, such as small rodents, birds and other primates. Its limit is usually small antelope, such as Thomson's gazelle, but will also kill sheep, goats, and chickens from farms, which may amount to around one third of its food from hunting. Hunting is usually a group activity, with both males and females participating. This systematic predation was apparently developed recently. In a field study, such behaviour was observed as starting with the males of one troop and spreading through all ages and sexes.

In Eritrea, the olive baboon has formed a symbiotic relationship with that country's endangered elephant population. The baboons use the water holes dug by the elephants, while the elephants use the tree-top baboons as an early warning system.

== Conservation status ==
The olive baboon is listed as least concern on the IUCN Red List because it is widespread with a large global population and not threatened by a range-wide population decline. Competition and disease have possibly led to fewer baboons in closed forests. Like most other baboon species, it is routinely exterminated as a pest for crop raiding and small livestock predation. The international trade of olive baboons is regulated under Appendix II of the CITES treaty.
