= Nyassang Forest Park =

- IUCN category IV (habitat/species management area)
- Interactive map of Nyassang Forest Park
- Location: Central River Division Gambia
- Nearest city: Janjanbureh
- Coordinates: 13°38′0″N 14°59′0″W
- Area: 2,347 ha (5,800 acres)
- Established: January 1, 1954

Nyassang Forest Park is a forest park in the Gambia. Established on January 1, 1954, it covers 2347 hectares.

It is located in Central River, Gambia. The estimate terrain elevation above sea level is 11 metres.
