= Hepatocystis brosseti =

Scientific classification
- Domain: Eukaryota
- Clade: Sar
- Clade: Alveolata
- Phylum: Apicomplexa
- Class: Aconoidasida
- Order: Haemospororida
- Family: Plasmodiidae
- Genus: Hepatocystis
- Species: H. brosseti

Binomial name
- Hepatocystis brosseti Miltgen, Landau, Rosin, Erardu, 1977

Species of single-celled organism

Hepatocystis brosseti is a species of parasitic protozoa that infect mammals. They are transmitted by flies of the genus Culicoides

== History ==
This species was described in 1977 by Miltgen et al.

== Geographical distribution ==
This species is found in Makokou, Gabon.

== Description ==
The cysts are found in the liver and spleen. Once mature the schizonts become extracellular, convoluted and filled with abundant colloidal substance. They are of medium size (diameter 250 micrometres).

== Host record ==
This species infects Franquet's epauletted fruit bat (Epomops franqueti).
