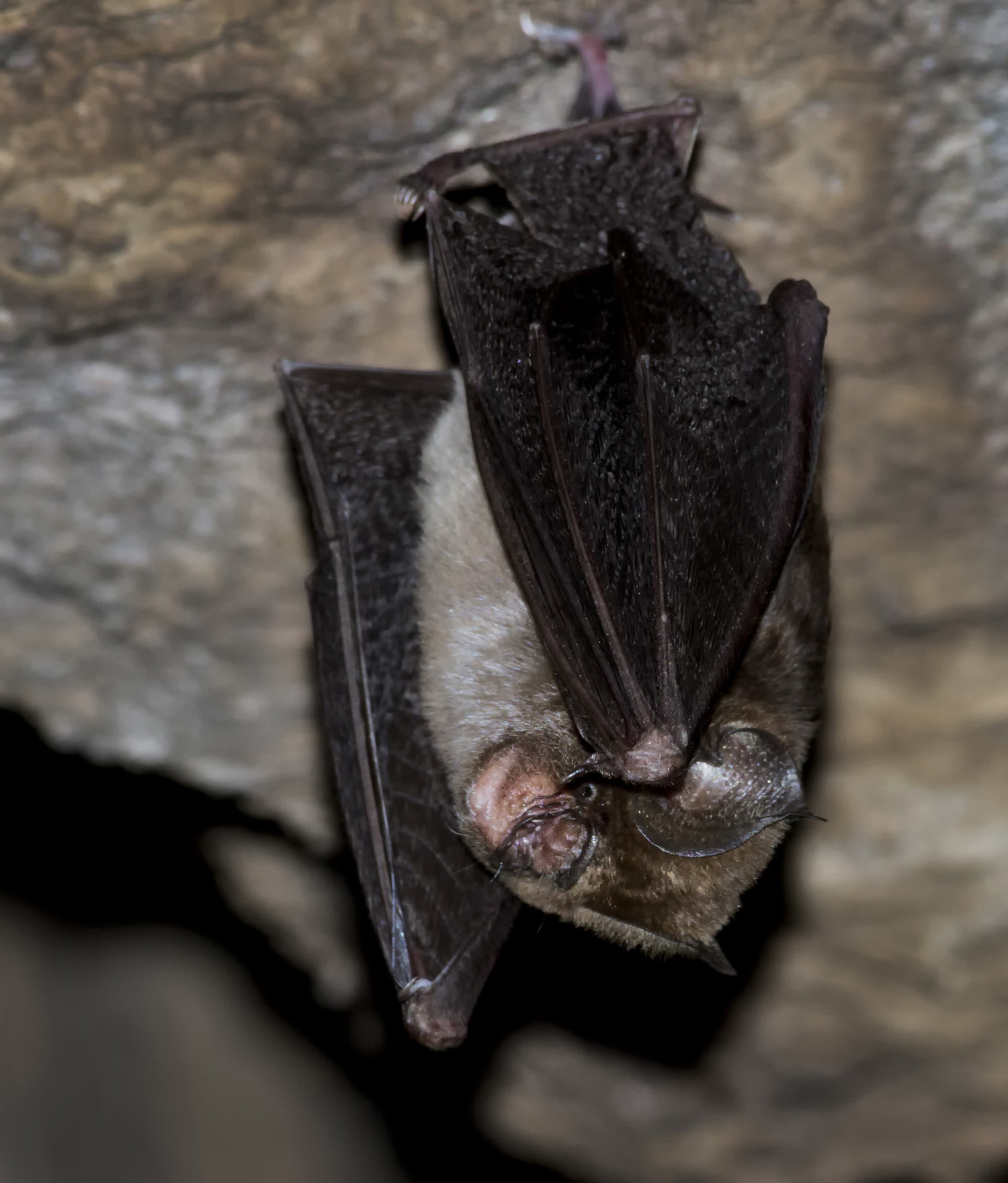

Conservation status
- Least Concern (IUCN 3.1)

Scientific classification
- Kingdom: Animalia
- Phylum: Chordata
- Class: Mammalia
- Order: Chiroptera
- Family: Hipposideridae
- Genus: Hipposideros
- Species: H. galeritus

Binomial name
- Hipposideros galeritus Cantor, 1846
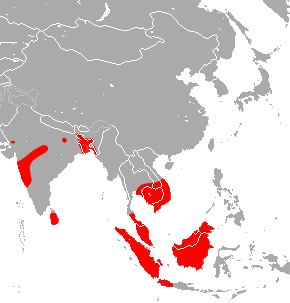
- Cantor's Roundleaf Bat range

= Cantor's roundleaf bat =

Species of bat

Cantor's roundleaf bat (Hipposideros galeritus) is a species of bat in the family Hipposideridae. It is found in Bangladesh, Brunei, Cambodia, India, Indonesia, Laos, Malaysia, Sri Lanka, Thailand and Vietnam.

== Taxonomy ==
Cantor's roundleaf bat was described as a new species in 1846 by Danish zoologist Theodore Edward Cantor. The holotype, a male, was collected in Malaysia in the "valley of Pinang".
