= Abuko Nature Reserve =

Nature reserve in the Gambia

- IUCN category IV (habitat/species management area)
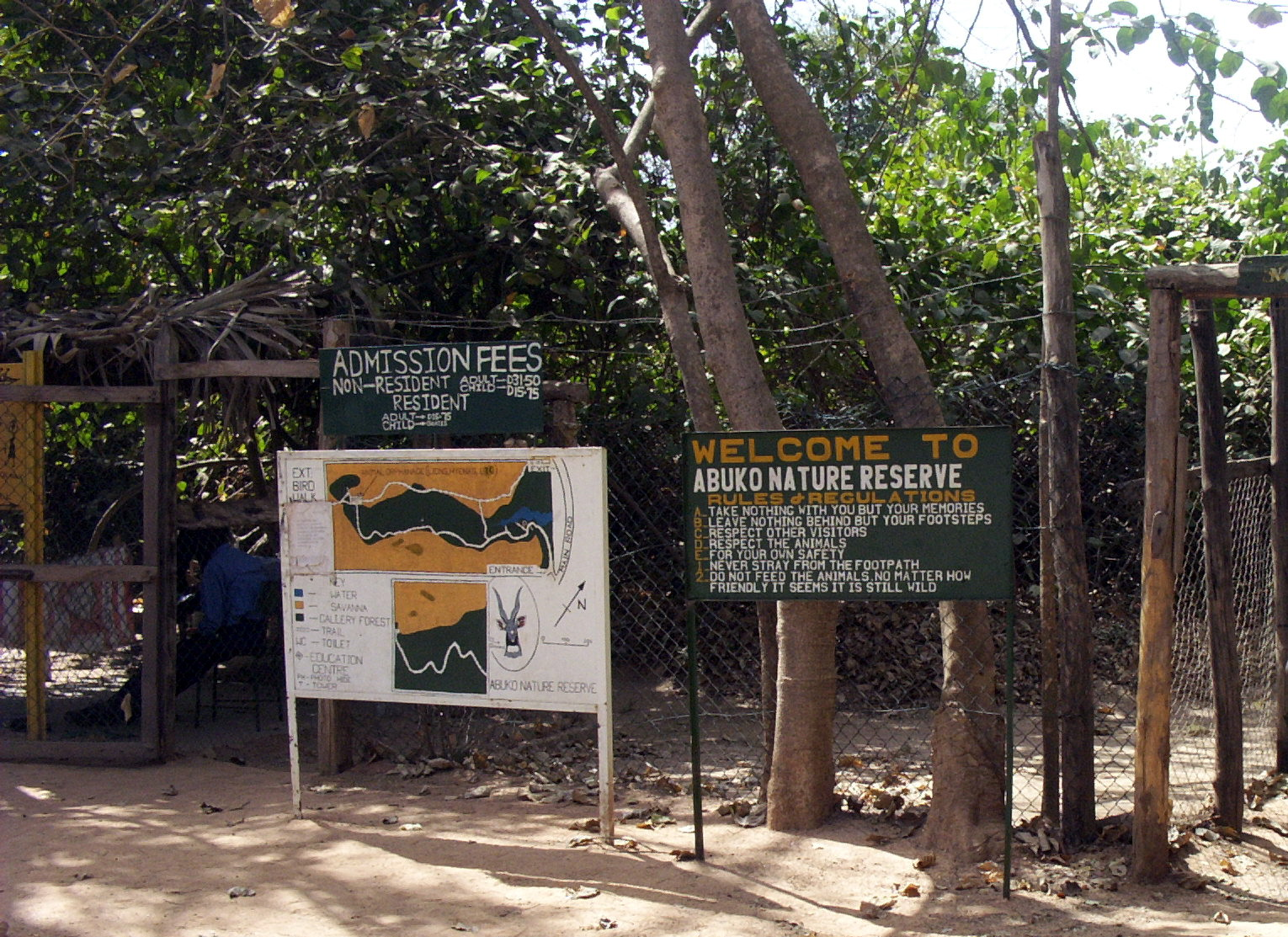
- Interactive map of Abuko Nature Reserve
- Location: Gambia
- Coordinates: 13°23′45″N 16°38′44″W
- Area: 107 ha (260 acres)
- Established: 1968

Abuko National Park is a nature reserve in the Gambia lying south of the town of Abuko. It is a popular tourist attraction and was the country's first designated wildlife reserve.

== History ==
The area was first accorded some measure of protection in 1916 when the Lamin Stream, which flows through the reserve, was fenced to form a water collection point. The enclosure of the stream saw an increase in the stock of wildlife and flora in the forest.

In 1967, wildlife officer Eddie Brewer and his daughter Stella Marsden visited the area and realised the conservation importance of the forest and its wildlife. Brewer made a request to the government for the area to be protected. In 1968 the Department of Wildlife, now the Gambia Department of Parks and Wildlife Management, was established at the reserve.

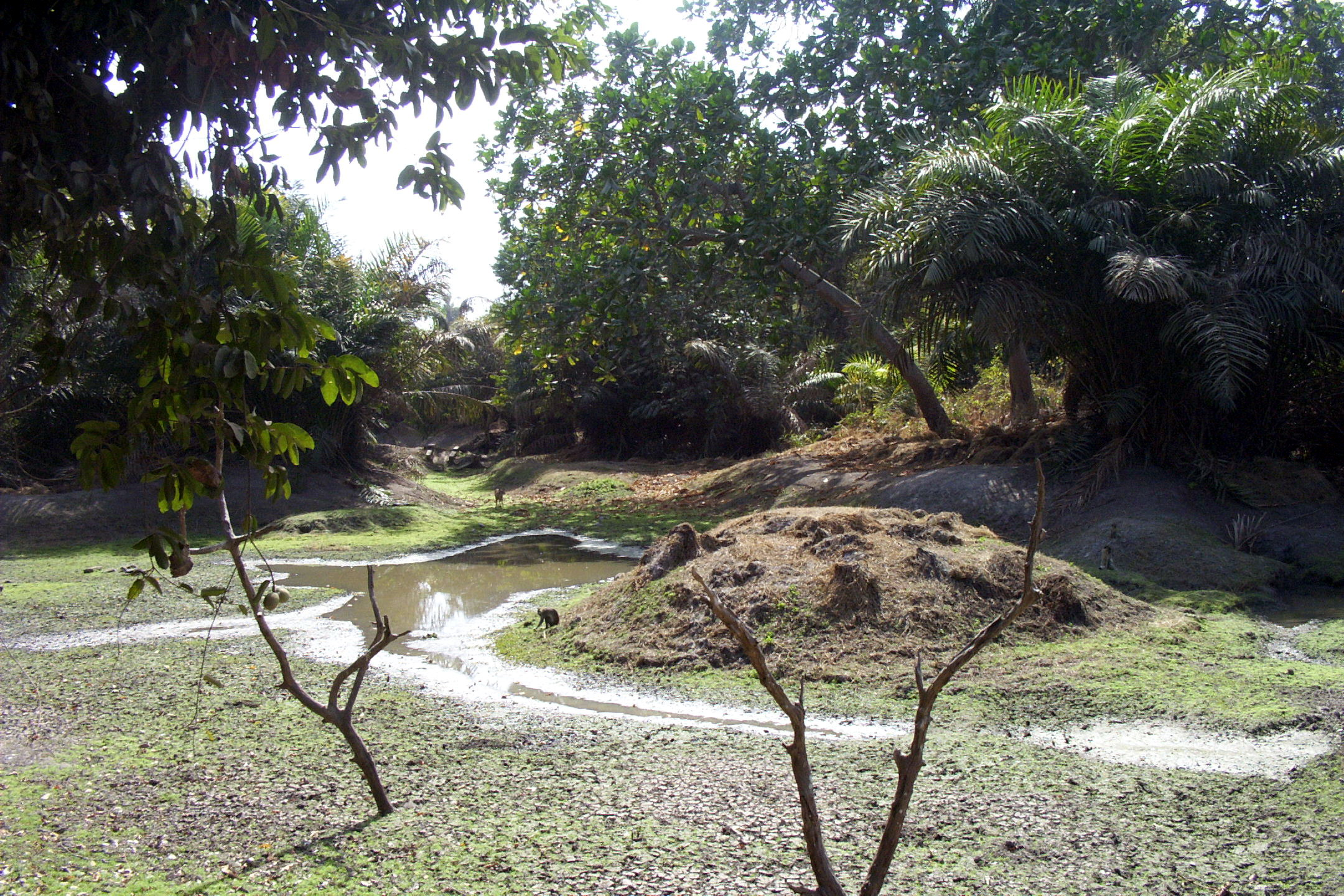
Lamin stream in February

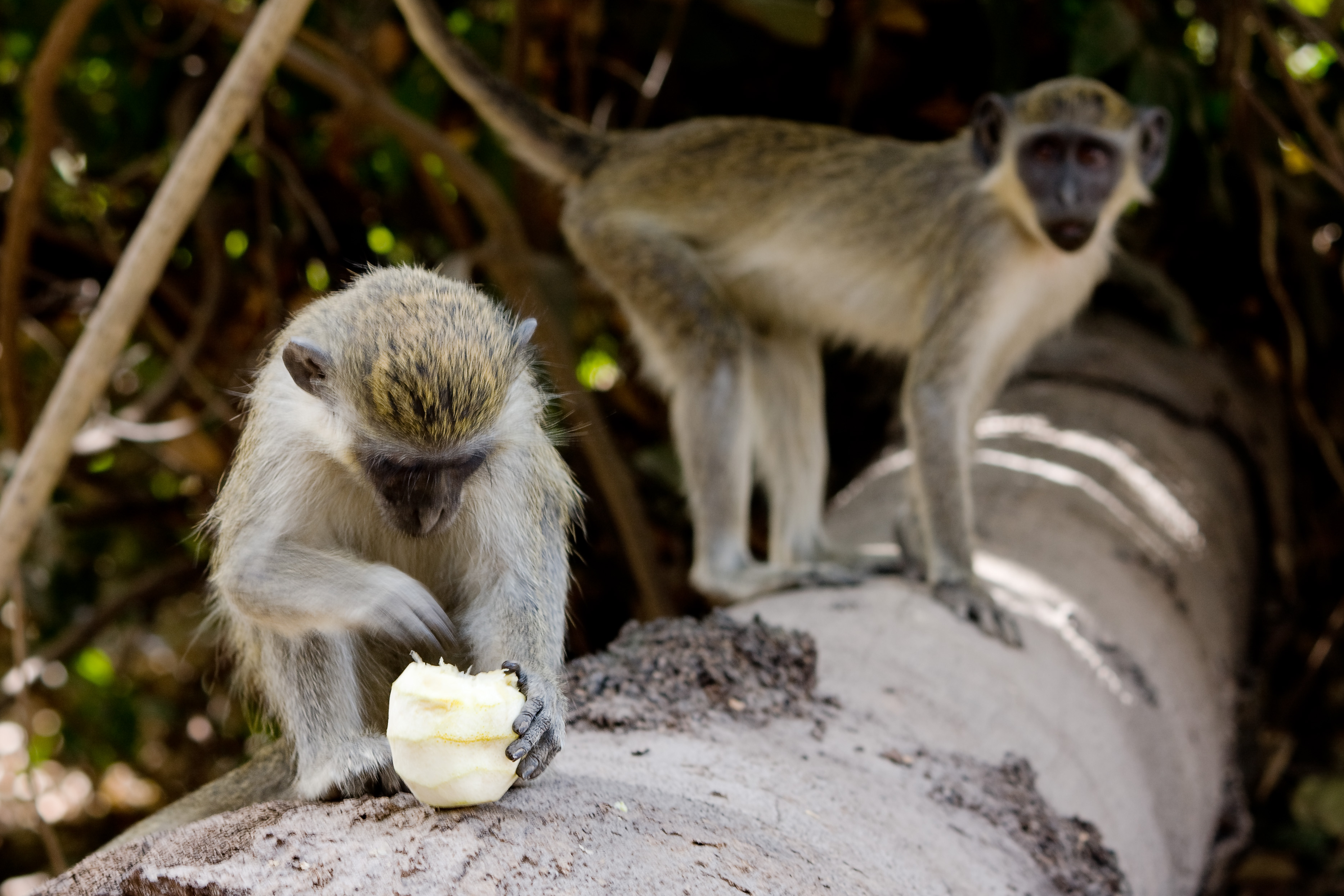
A monkey eating an orange in the park

== Environment ==
=== Flora ===
The flora consists of a typical savanna and gallery forest landscape. Typical trees, up to thirty feet high, are: oil palm, mahogany, iroko and Anthocleista procera.

=== Fauna ===
There are three monkey species: vervet monkeys, red colobus monkeys and patas monkeys. Other mammals include antelope, squirrel, porcupine, African palm civets, mongooses, galagos, and several types of rodents, including cane rats. At one end of the site are several enclosures which serve as an orphanage for needy animals, including an enclosure in which a pack of hyenas is held.

Among the reptiles at the park are monitor lizard, Nile crocodile, dwarf crocodile, spitting cobra, black cobra, python, puff adder and green mamba. There are also numerous butterflies and moths.

More than 270 bird species have been recorded in the forest. The reserve has been designated an Important Bird Area (IBA) by BirdLife International because it supports significant populations of Ahanta francolins, white-spotted flufftails, green turacos, red-legged sparrowhawks, West African pied hornbills, spotted honeyguides, buff-spotted woodpeckers, African shrike-flycatchers, red-bellied paradise-flycatchers, western nicators, green crombecs, olive-green camaropteras, Fanti saw-wings, grey-headed bristlebills, swamp palm bulbuls, leaf-loves, green hylias, blue-billed malimbes, western bluebills and chestnut-breasted nigritas.

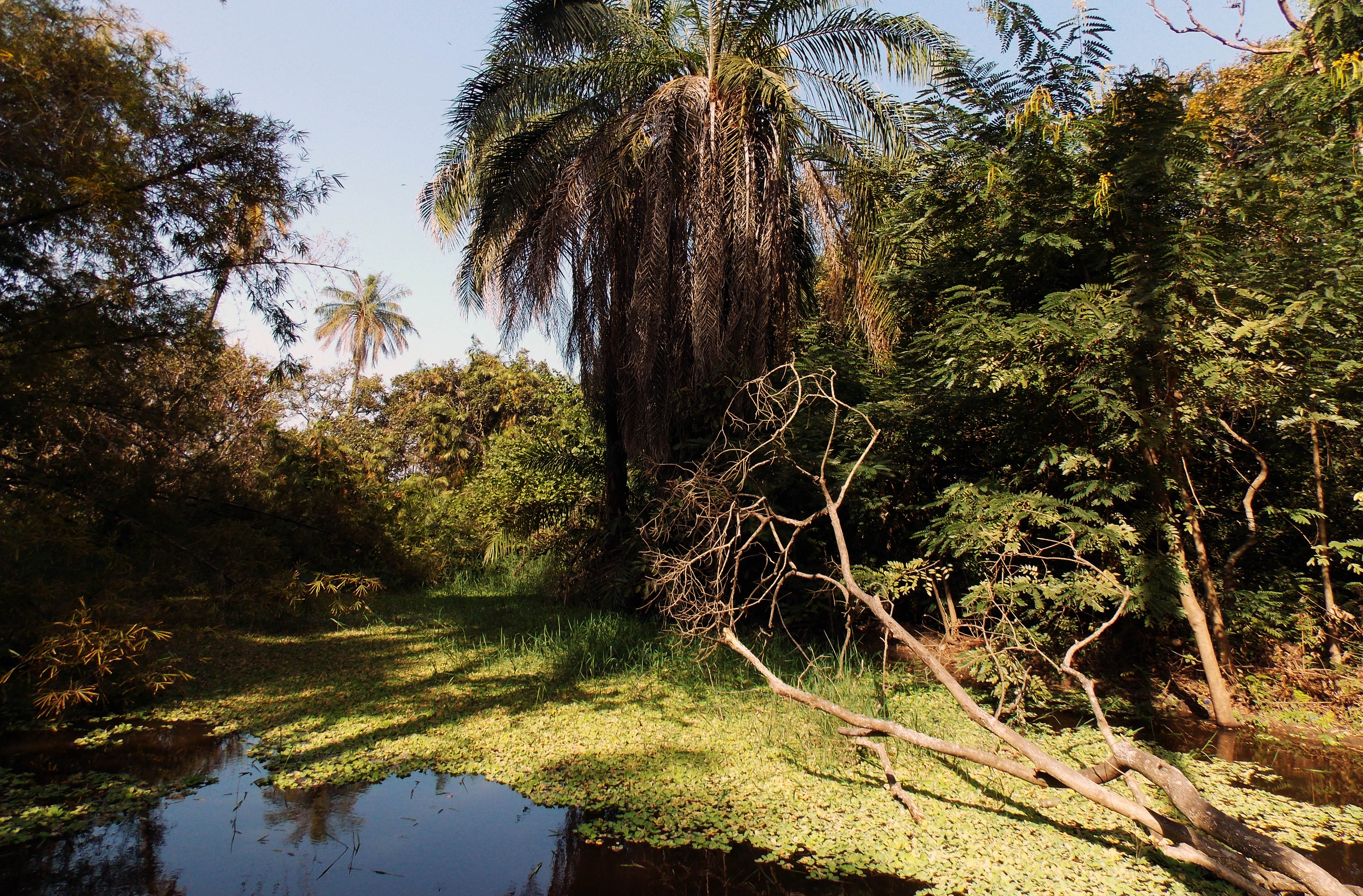
Reserve flora, including oil palms
