= Wildlife of the Gambia =

Location of the Gambia

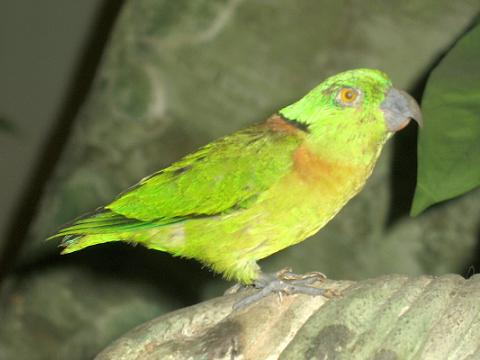
Black-collared lovebird

The wildlife of the Gambia is dictated by several habitat zones over the Gambia's land area of about 10,000 km^{2}. It is bound in the south by the savanna and on the north by the Sudanian woodlands. The habitats host abundant indigenous plants and animals, in addition to migrant species and newly planted species. They vary widely and consist of the marine system, coastal zone, estuary with mangrove vegetation coupled with Banto Faros (barren hypersaline flats), river banks with brackish and fresh water zones, swamps covered with forests and many wetlands.

According to the government of the Gambia, about 3.7% of the land area of the country has been brought under national parks or reserves, and the present wildlife policy is to extend this coverage to 5%. The seven areas included in the protected list are the Niumi National Park, Kiang West National Park, River Gambia National Park, Bao Bolong Wetland Reserve, Abuko Nature Reserve, Tanbi Wetland Complex and the Tanji Karinti River Bird Reserve. These are managed by the Department of Parks and Wildlife Management. The area covered by these parks is 38,000 ha.

The birdlife in the Gambia is colourful and rich, with 560 species inhabiting coastal saltwater, freshwater wetlands, Guinea and Sudan savanna, woodlands and forests, agricultural lands, towns and villages. It is thus a biodiversity hot spot for ornithologists.

== Geography ==
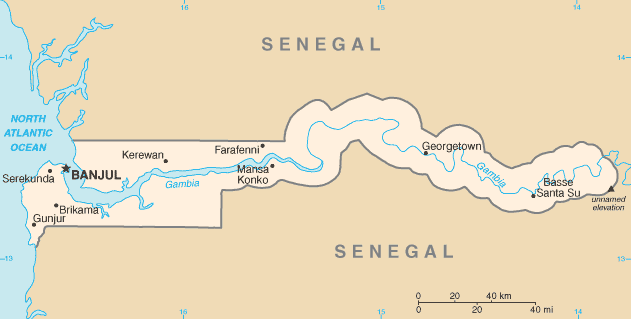
The Gambia River in its lower reaches flows through the entire length of the country up to the North Atlantic Ocean

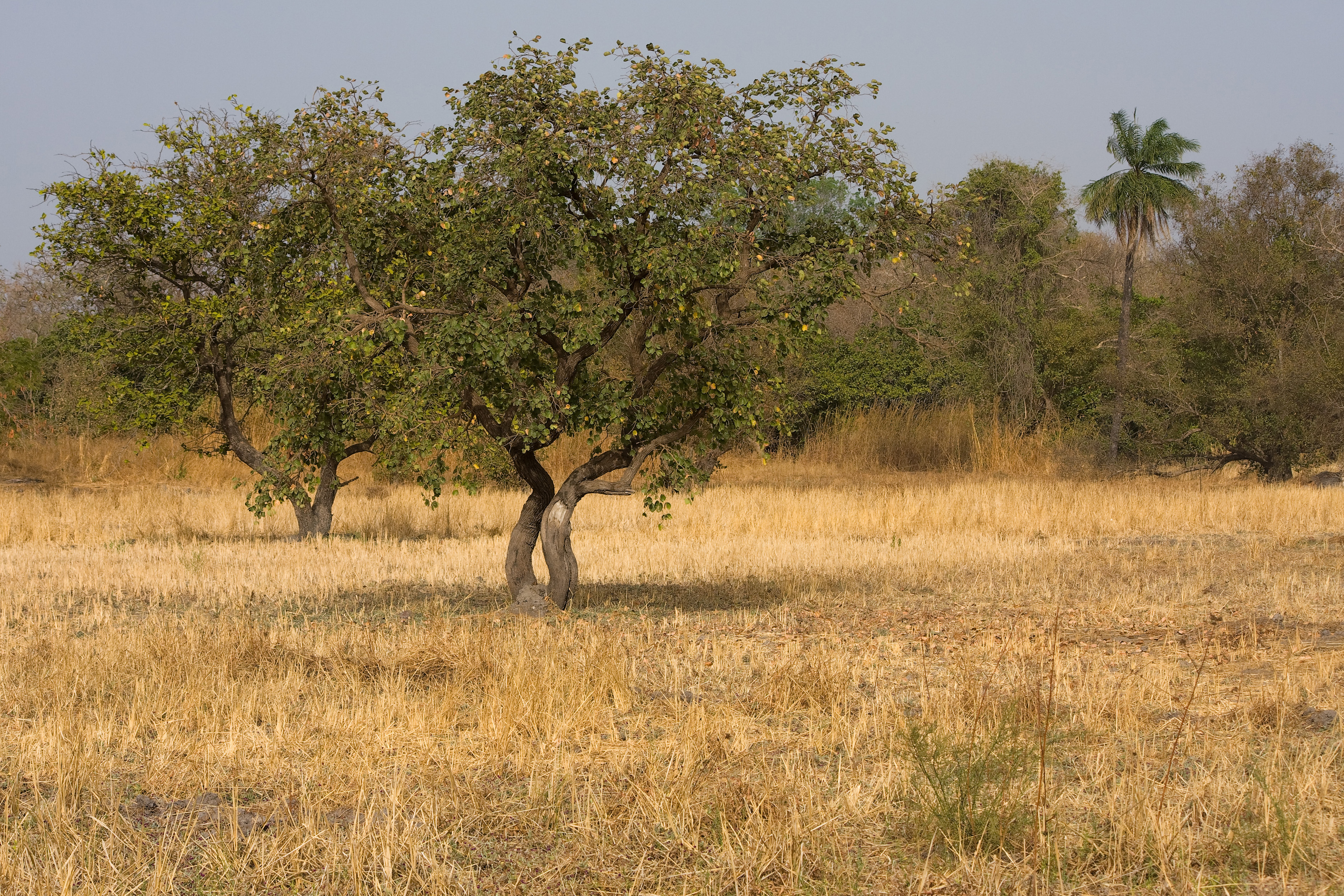
Savanna in Kiang West National Park in the Gambia

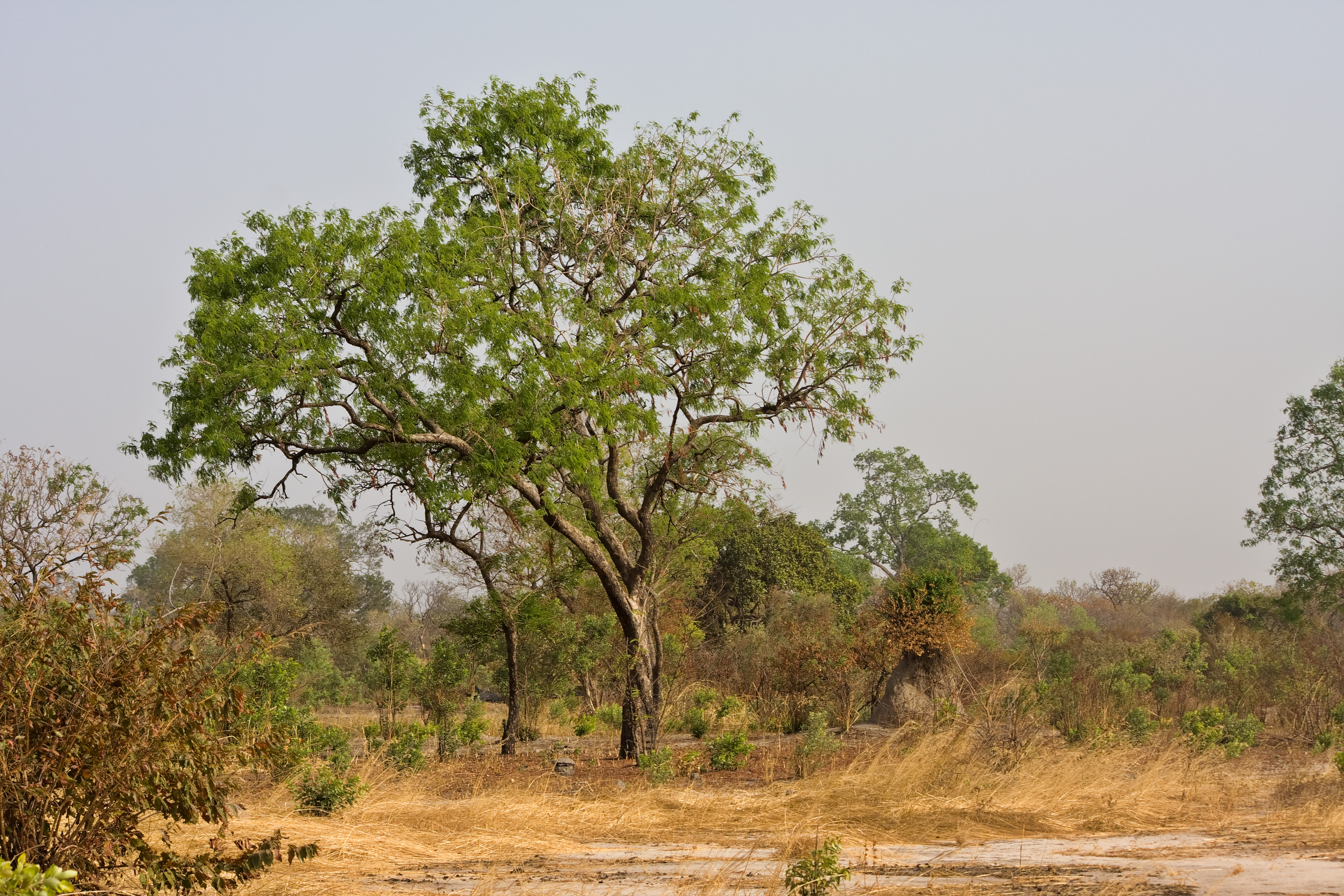
Young mahogany trees in Kiang West National Park in the Gambia.

The flat terrain of the Gambia, drained by the Gambia River is categorised under several habitat types. The habitat types are the coast, mangroves and Banto Faros, wetlands, farmlands, savanna and the Sahel habitats, gallery forests and urban habitats.

The coast extends to 40 kilometres (25 mi) into the sea with extensive sea green grass meadows where aqua fauna dominate; the long stretch of beach here, with occasional hills or cliffs, is topped with plants which are salt tolerant and bind the terrain. Above these are the very old beaches at an elevation where the rich vegetation consists of baobab (Adansonia digitata) and ron palm (Borassus aethiopum) species interspersed with shrubs and grassland. The sea grass meadows of the coastal areas are rich in green sea turtles (Chelonia mydas), dolphins, common minke whales (Balaenoptera acutorostrata) and Mediterranean monk seals (Monachus monachus), which feed on the fish.

Mangroves and Banto Faros are the mangrove swamp forests seen at the mouth of the Gambia River and extending along the river inland up to Kaur, 150 kilometres (93 mi) into the brackish river stretch. It is a transitional zone between aquatic and terrestrial habitats. Two types of mangrove forests, namely the white mangrove colonies and the red mangroves, are of short height near the coast but raise to 15–20 m upstream. Banto Faros are found, after the mangroves, in flat lands which are barren and salt encrusted; however, succulent plants grow in some of the less saline thick mats. Fishes spawn in the mangroves before they move offshore into the sea. Mangrove oysters, (Crassostrea gasar and Crassostrea tulipa) are also extensively found on mangrove trees in this habitat. The trees are used as firewood and as building material.

Wetlands consist of salt pans, lagoons, marshes, mangrove swamps, mudflats, saltwater rivers, fresh water reaches of rivers such as the Gambia River, flooded sand mines, watering holes for animals, paddy fields and ephemeral marshes with reed vegetation in flooded areas. Crustaceans, annelid worms and molluscs are the fauna in the wetlands where migrant birds and wading birds find their feed.

Farmlands, including savanna and woodland, form now a dominant habitat in the Gambia where crops were grown initially on a rotation system of 20 years with a fallow period. This practice has since changed to two or three years rotation. While the agricultural crops grown are sorghum, millet and ground nuts, the tree species retained, within the lands cleared for agricultural use, are the Acacia albida, baobab, ficus species, winterthorn and African locust bean (Parkia biglobosa).

Savanna and the Sahel habitats are of two types. One is the southern Guinea savanna which has rich and dense vegetation of over 50 tree species. The other is the Sudanian savanna which is contiguous to the Guinea savanna on the north bank of the Gambia River. These areas are dry woodlands with soils of laterite formations. The local tree species include silk cotton (Bombax costatum), dry-zone mahogany (Khaya senegalensis) in deeper soil areas and African rosewood (Guibourtia coleosperma). Short grasses and shrubs are seen thinly spread in the Sahelian habitats.

The gallery forests (moisture forests), unlike the rainforest, thrive on groundwater and are integral to savannas. It is a rare habitat found only in Abuko Nature Reserve, Pirang Forest Park and in some stretches of the Gambia River with different set of species with some degree of overlap with rainforests.

Urban habitats consist of numerous villages. The open areas in between have large green stretches with a profusion of tree species, particularly mango (Mangifera indica) trees.

Law of the land

Some parts of the land area of the Gambia, under the protection of the Banjul Declaration of 1977, which is the law on wild life, includes seven protected zones. The law prohibits all types of hunting, except of animals harmful to the environment, such as warthogs, giant pouched rats and francolins. Also, as a signatory to the Convention on International Trade in Endangered Species of Wild Fauna and Flora (CITES), the Gambia enforces laws prohibiting export or even possession within the country of any animal skins, horns or turtle shells.

== Fauna ==
=== Mammals ===
More than 100 species of mammals have been reported.

Bats
There are 30–40 species of bats. They are of two types, fruit-eating and insect-eating bats. Straw-coloured fruit bats (Eidolon helvum) and epaulated fruit bats (Epomophorus gambianus) are the most common species. Bats help in eating the malarial insects, with each bat consuming about 3000 mosquitoes per night. Eidolon helvum is a commonly seen bat during the rainy season when flowers and fruits (mangoes) are in full bloom.

Rodents
Rodents include the Gambian sun squirrel (Heliosciurus gambianus), striped ground squirrels (Xerus erythropus)s, nocturnal crested porcupines (Hystrix cristata), mongooses, brush-tailed porcupine, civets and genets.

Aquatic mammals
Aquatic mammals include two species of dolphin, the Atlantic bottlenose dolphin (Tursiops truncatus) and the Atlantic humpback dolphin (Sousa teuszii) and the West African manatee (Trichechus senegalensis).

Carnivores
Leopards and hyenas are still occasionally thought to cross into the more remote areas of East Gambia.

Herbivores
Bushbuck, Maxwell's duiker, warthog and hippopotamus.

Primates
Bijilo forests have endangered western red colobus monkey, the callithrix monkey (Chlorocebus sabaeus). King West National Park has baboons, and patas monkeys (Erythrocebus patas). The Senegal bushbaby (Galago senegalensis), Campbell's mona monkey (Cercopithecus campbelli). The River Gambia National park has chimpanzee (Pan troglodytes). The western red colobus (Procolobus badius) are a common sight in the Kiang West National Park, Bijilo Forest Park and Abuko Nature Reserve. Guinea baboon (Papio papio), which is large in size and fierce in appearance, is found in the northern region and also in small numbers in the coastal Makasutu Culture Forest.

The aardvark is also still reported, although very rarely seen.

=== Reptiles and amphibians ===
There are 40 snake species, 9 of which are venomous, such as cobras, puff adders and mambas, genus Dendroaspis; the first two are common. The non-venomous reptiles are pythons, bush snakes, lizards agamas and skinks (with brown and orange flanks); Bosc's monitor, Nile monitors (Varanus niloticus), which are voracious predators; tree geckos; and chameleon.

Three species of crocodiles reported are: slender-snouted crocodile (Mecistpos cataphractus), West African dwarf crocodile (Osteolaemus tetraspis) and West African crocodile; the first two are on the endangered list.

Amphibians consist of 33 species, toads, tree frogs, crowned bullfrogs, edible bullfrogs and reed frogs.

=== Birds ===
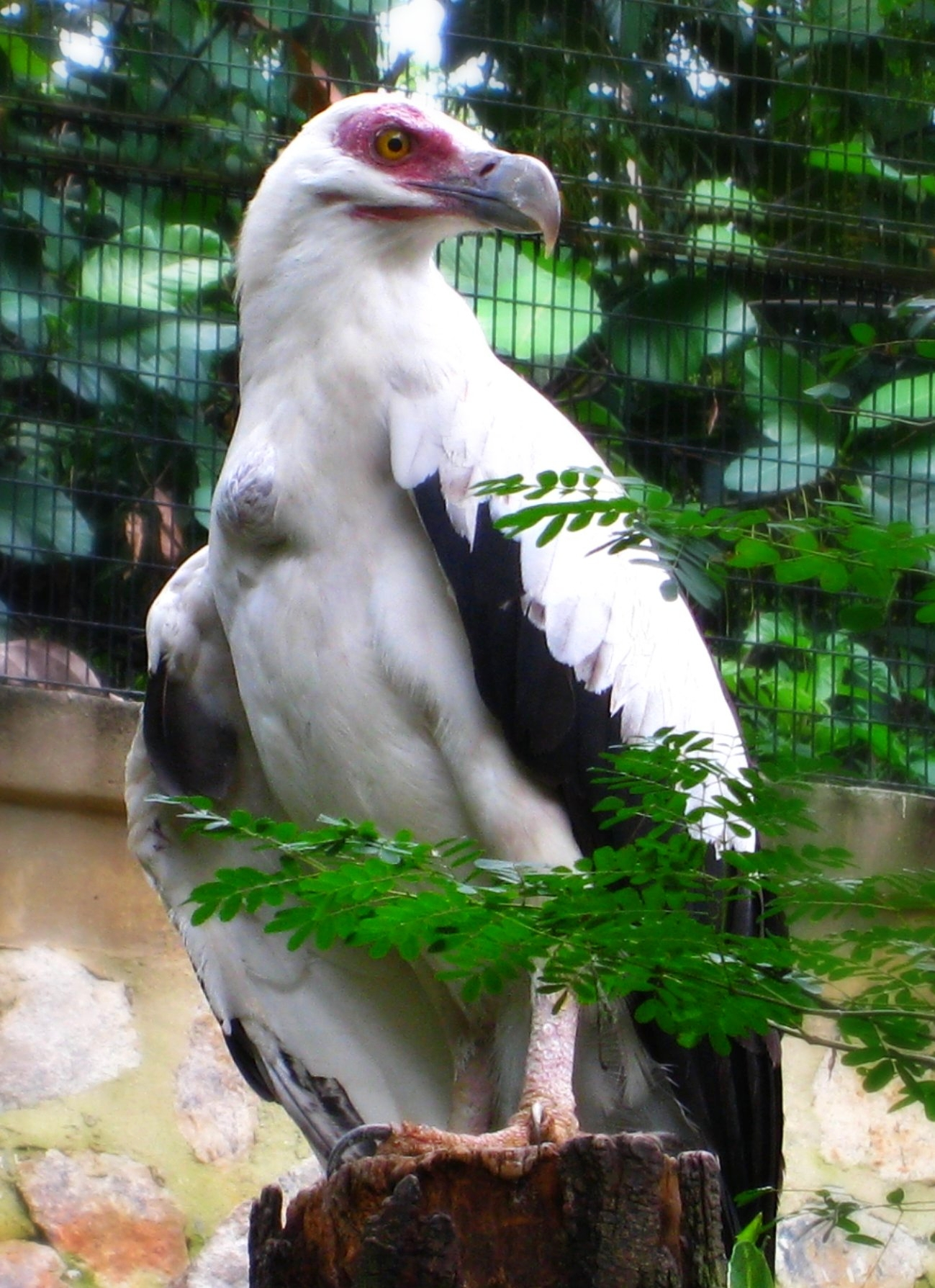
Palm-nut vulture in the Gambia

More than 500 species of birds live in the Gambia. The Bijilo Forest Park and the Abuko are important bird habitats. Birds seen here are the pelicans, spoonbills, yellow-billed stork (Mycteria ibis), Goliath heron (Ardea goliath), blue-cheeked bee-eater (Merops persicus), mouse-brown sunbird (Anthreptes gabonicus), African fish eagle (Hieraaetus spilogaster) (in the river valleys). Wetland bird species are Dendrocygna viduata, sacred ibis (Threskiornis aethiopicus), palm-nut vulture (Gypohierax angolensis), crakes, greater painted snipe (Rostratula benghalensis) and African jacana (Actophilornis africanus).

Butterfly distribution in the Gambia is dictated by the boundary of two major biomes of Sahelian and Guinean Savanna species; it is distinctly different between the rainy season and dry season.

== Flora ==
The vegetation of the Gambia is mostly savanna in the upland areas, inland swamp in the low-lying areas, and mangrove swamp along the banks of the lower Gambia River. The country is almost devoid of true forest cover, the most forested area being the Bijo Forest. Nonetheless, it is biologically rich, with an estimated 11,600 plant species many of which are used for medicinal purposes. Many plants are grown for food. The cassava (Manihot esculenta) was brought to the Gambia by the Portuguese between the 17th and 18th centuries. It grows up to 4 metres or 13 feet high and is a staple of the national diet, with each person consuming an average of 100 kg per annum in 2002 according to the Food and Agriculture Organization. Coastal inland forest comprises part of Bijilo Forest Park, Abuko Nature Reserve, Pirang Forest Park, and the River Gambia National Park.

The gummy Combretum glutinosum, Combretum micranthum, Combretum paniculatum and Combretum racemosum are common shrubs in the savanna areas of the country. Combretum paniculatum may be found on the edges of the forests in the north of the country. These plants usually have red petals and the Combretum racemosum has red 4-part flowers, but with inflorescence rimmed by white bracts.

== Bibliography ==
- Emms, Craig; Barnett, Linda & Human, Richard (2006). The Gambia. Bradt Travel Guides. ISBN 978-1-84162-137-1.
- Penney, David (2009). Field Guide to Wildlife of The Gambia: an introduction to common flowers & animals. Siri Scientific Press. ISBN 978-0-9558636-1-5.
