= Bao Bolong Wetland Reserve =

Protected area in the Gambia

- IUCN category VI (protected area with sustainable use of natural resources)
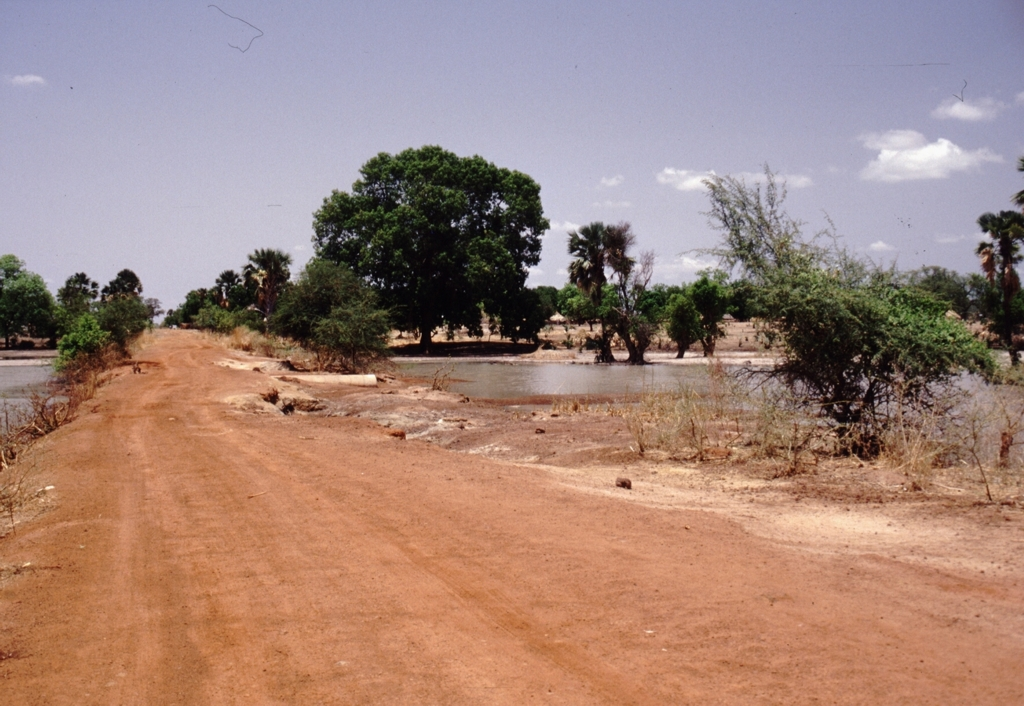

- Location within The Gambia
- Location: Gambia, North Bank Division
- Nearest city: Salikenne
- Coordinates: 13°31′N 15°52′W
- Area: 220 km^{2} (85 sq mi)
- Established: 1996

Ramsar Wetland
- Official name: Baobolon Wetland Reserve
- Designated: 16 September 1996
- Reference no.: 860

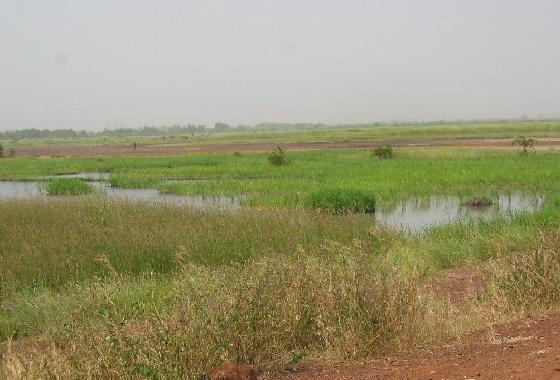

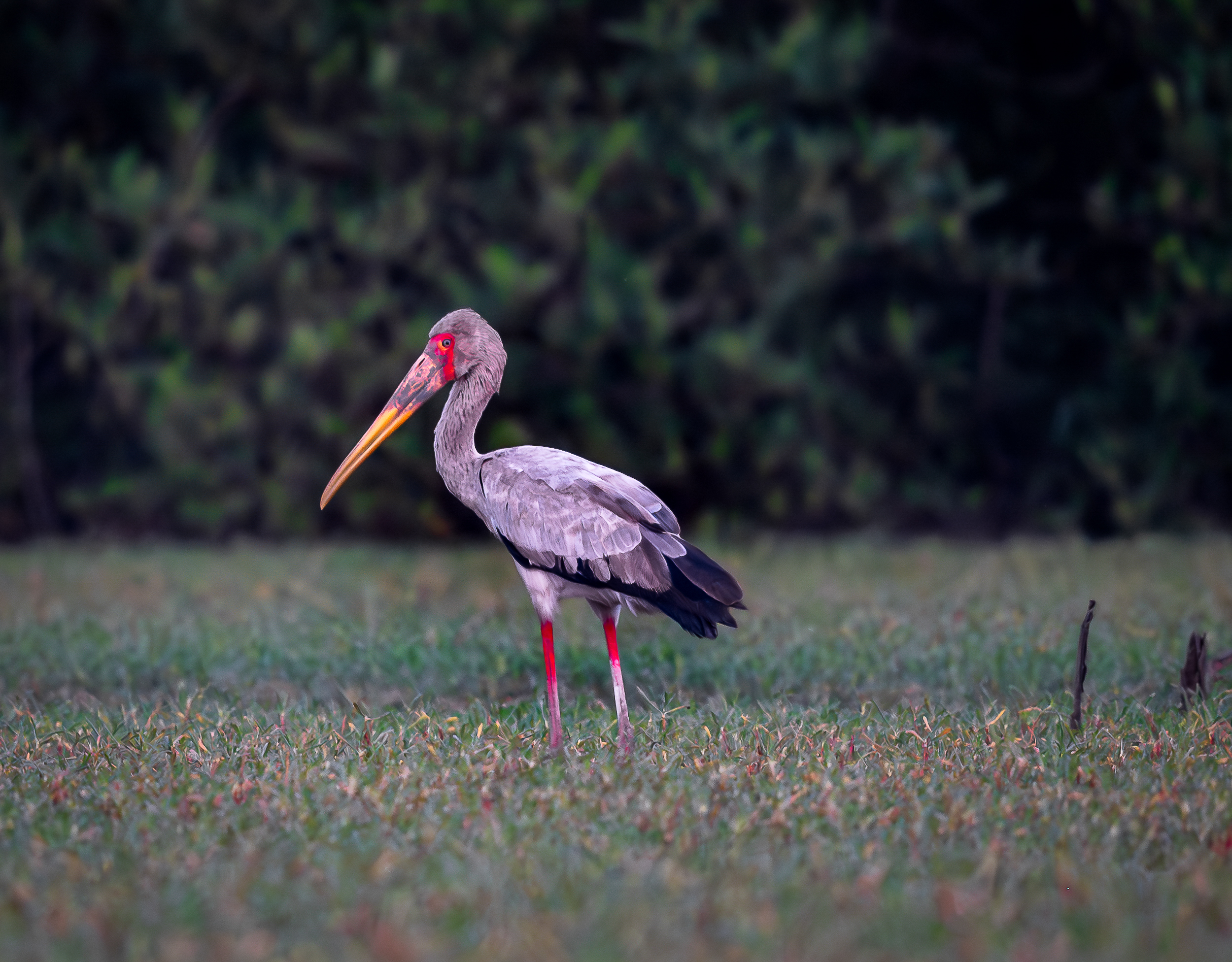
The yellow-billed stork (Mycteria ibis) is a large African stork

Bao Bolong (also Baobolong, Bao Bolon or Baobolon) Wetland Reserve is a protected area in The Gambia. Established in 1996, it covers 296.5 square kilometres.

The Wetland Reserve is located on the north bank of the River Gambia, approximately 100 km (52 nautical miles) from the river mouth. The name is derived from the Bao Bolon tributary that rises in Senegal and enters the River Gambia. It extends from the River Gambia north to the Senegalese border along the Baobolon tributary.

== History ==
On 1 January 1993, an area of 35 km^{2} was first declared as Bao Bolong National Reserve. From 16 September 1996 on, it has covered an extended area of 220 km^{2} (200 km^{2} according to other sources). It was the first reserve in the Gambia to be acknowledged as a wetland area worthy of protection according to the Ramsar Convention. Since 1975, this convention, whose draft had been initiated by the United Nations Educational, Scientific and Cultural Organization (UNESCO), protects the habitat of water birds and Charadriiformes. For other nature reserves in the country, such as Tanbi Wetland Complex or Niumi National Park (NNP), a Ramsar acknowledgement is also being aimed at by the Gambian authorities. As with NNP, it is intended to extend Bao Bolong Wetland Reserve across the border and to jointly administrate the area with Senegalese authorities.

== Geography ==
The reserve features a length of 22 kilometres and an approximate width of nine km. The western part is located in the Central Baddibu district while the eastern part adheres to Upper Baddibu, both of which belonging to the North Bank Division.

Chiefly, the reserve is made up of the river Bao Bolong's estuary, one of the bigger tributaries of the river Gambia. It is located about 100 km away from the Gambia's mouth into Atlantic Ocean. The roughly 100 km long Bao Bolong river's spring is situated in Senegal. Furthermore, BBWR includes the rivers Salokini Bolong, Mandon Bolong, Duntu Malang Bolong, Tanku Bolong and Katchang Bolong.

The Gambia river thereby formes the southern boundary of the protected area. Approximately two kilometres away on the opposite bank of the river, the roughly 115 km^{2} large Kiang West National Park is located. A some two and a half kilometres wide zone of dense mangrove forest adjoins to the river. To the west lies the town of Salikenne (population about 4,000), which is also located near the Dobo Forest Park of 7.32 km^{2}. At the western border, the Jalabiro Forest Park of 0.59 km^{2} can moreover be found.

The northern edge is bordered by the north bank road, Gambia's secondmost important highway. Along this road and the fork to Salikenne, several smaller towns like Nja Kunda, Minti Kunda, Kekuta Kunda, No Kunda, Konti Kunda Sukoto, Konti Kunda Nji and Illiassa are situated. In the east, following a fork of nine km length from the north bank road, the town of Katchang of 1,700 residents can be reached. Farafenni, with a population of more than 30,000 being the division's largest city, lies roughly 18 km outside the outer limits of BBWR to the east. Summed up, there are 25 small towns which are situated at the wetland reserve's boundaries, one among them being inside the park limits proper. The inhabitants of these towns conduct fishery for personal requirements and their stock graze inside BBWR. Furthermore, they collect timber and fire wood there.

The terrain is flat, the highest elevation is cited with 12 metres above mean sea level.

== Flora and fauna ==
=== Ecosystems ===
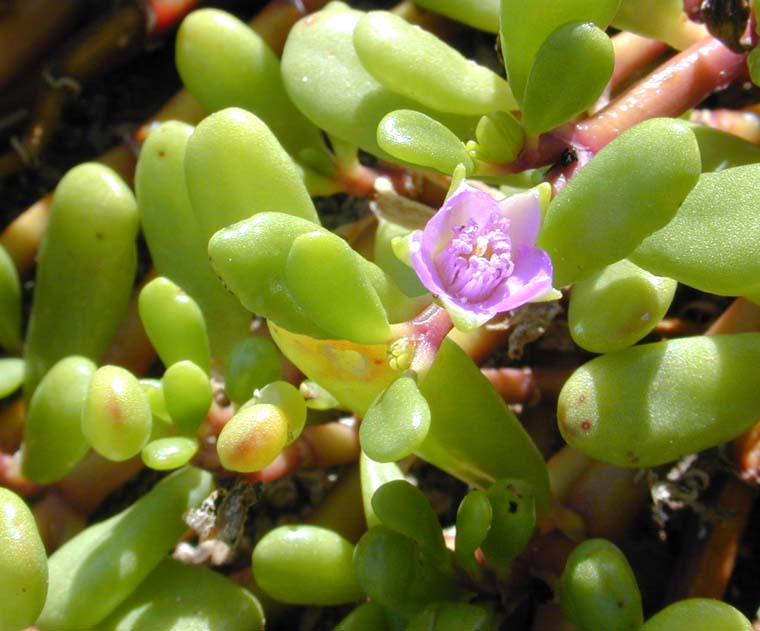
Sesuvium portulacastrum

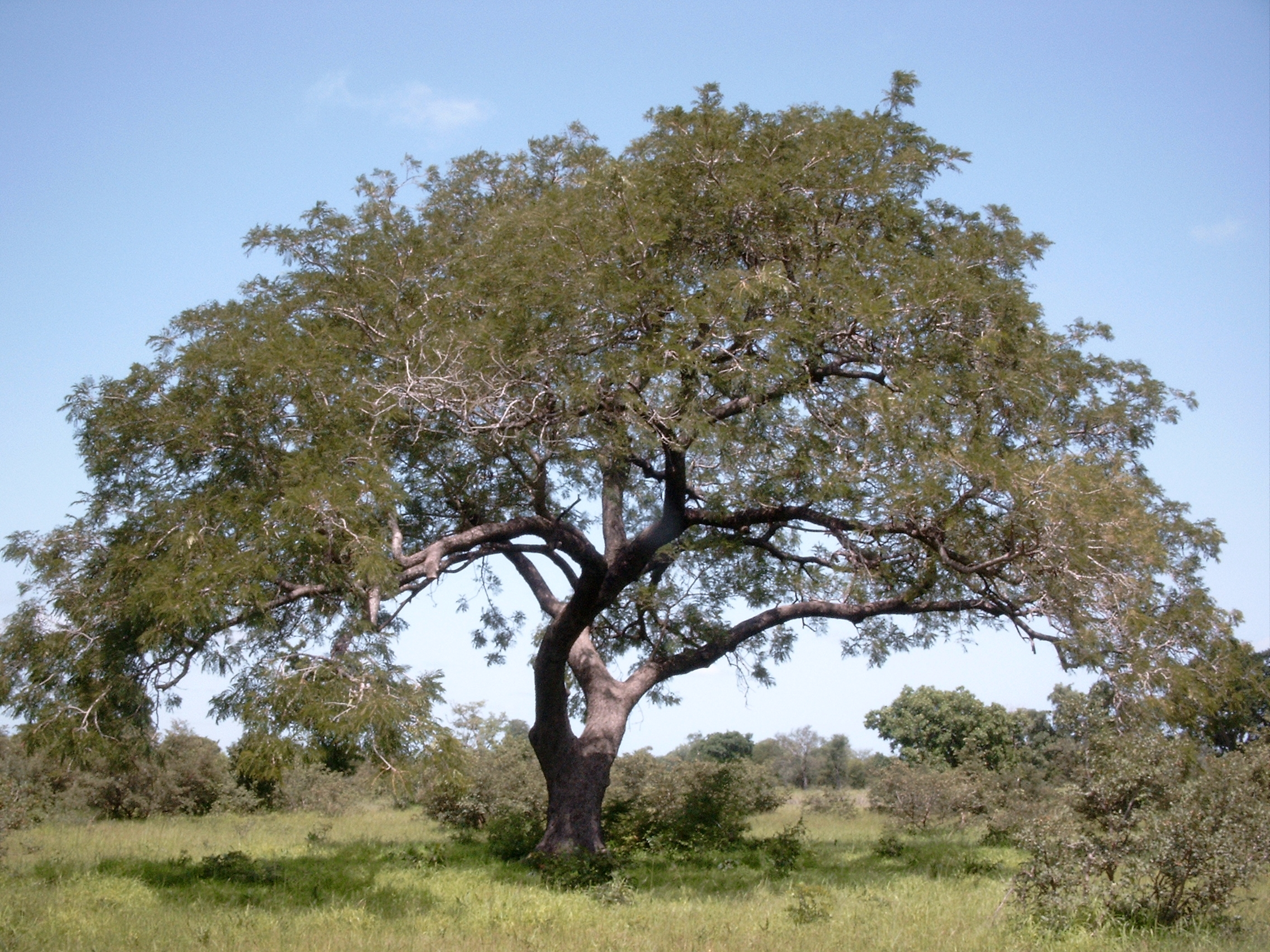
Néré (Parkia biglobosa)

Bao Bolong Wetland Reserve includes a rich fauna and flora within multiple ecosystems. Important, protected tree species are pointed out by the "Ramsar Information Sheet", such as Pterocarpus erinaceus, Parinari macrophylla, the ana tree, wild mango trees (Cordyla africana) and Néré (Parkia biglobosa).

==== Mangroves ====
Only in the mangrove forest of Bao Bolong Wetland Reserve the mangrove trees of the Senegambia region reach a height of 20 metres. The species Rhizophora racemosa, red mangrove (Rhizophora mangle) and black mangrove (Avicennia germinans) are widespread among them.

==== Saltmarsh ====
In the salt marshes, e.g. the succulent Sesuvium portulacastrum and grasses like Sporobolus spicatus, Paspalum vaginatum as well as Diplachne fusca can be found. In the savanna, which at times is flooded, Phragmites karka, Echinochloa pyramidalis and paper reed are very common.

==== Savanna ====
In the savanna, trees like Daniellia oliveri, Terminalia albida, Bombax costatum and others are to be found. Among the shrubs one will encounter several species of figs, Physostigma thonningii, Terminalia avicennioides, Anthostema senegalense and Nauclea latifolia. For grasses, Andropogon tectorum and Gamba grass (Andropogon gayanus), Beckeropsis uniseta and Pennisetum subangustum are common.

=== Birds ===
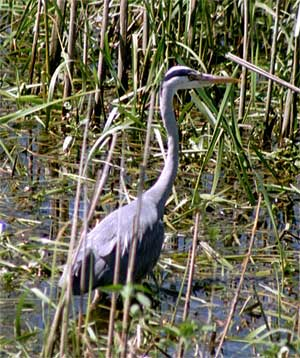
Grey heron (Ardea cinerea)

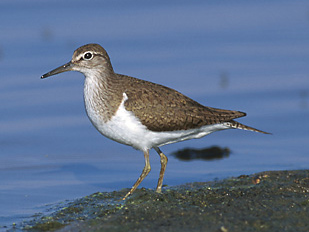
Common sandpiper (Actitis hypoleucos)

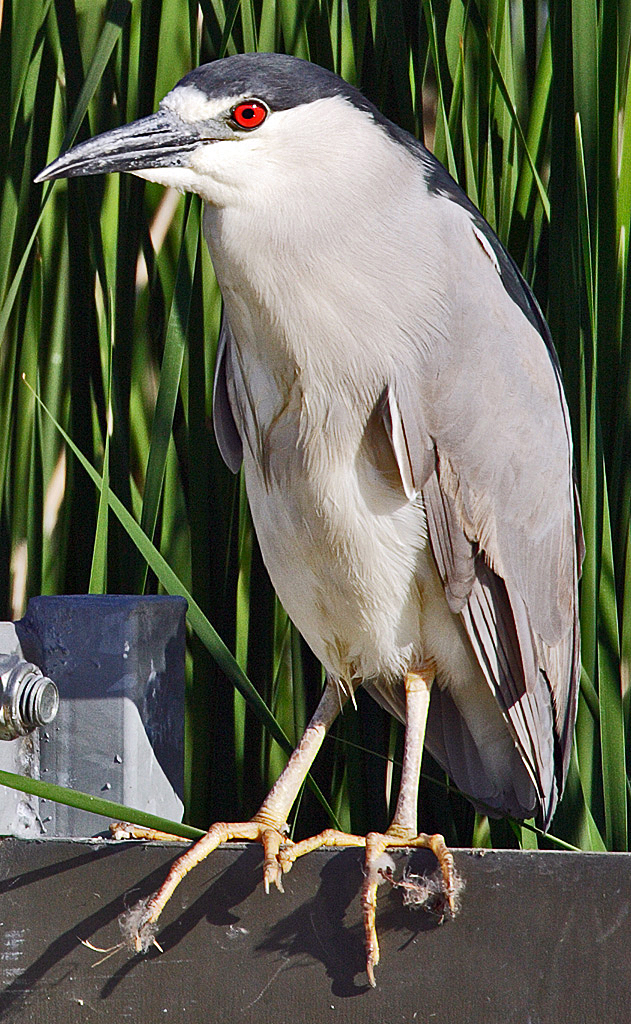
Black-crowned night heron (Nycticorax nycticorax)

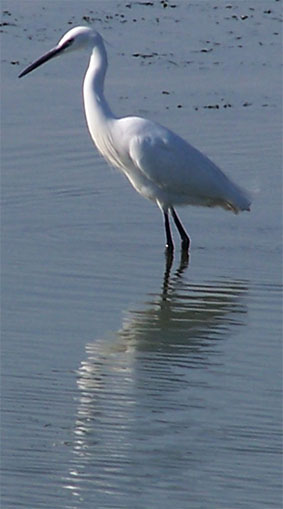
Little egret (Egretta garzetta)

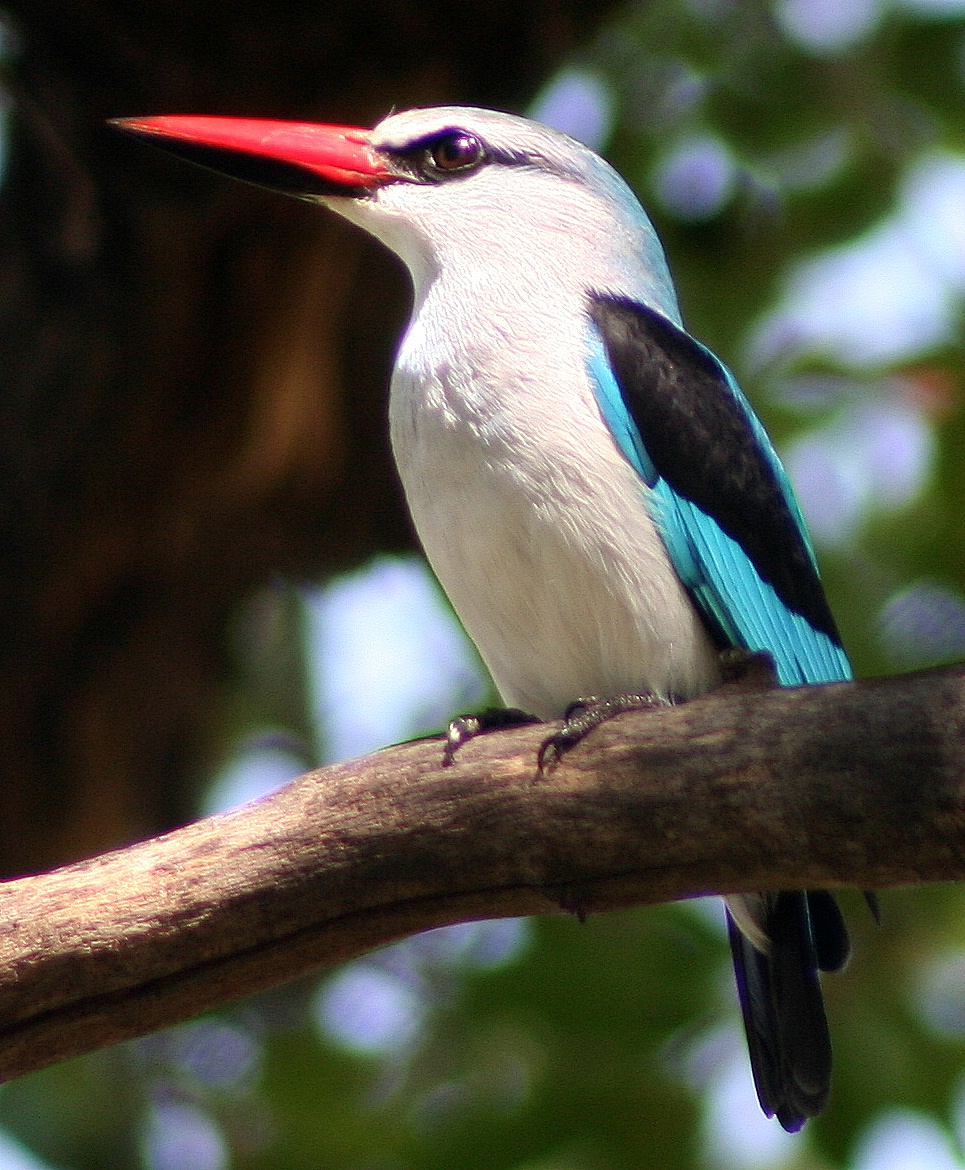
Woodland kingfisher (Halcyon senegalensis)

The Gambia is frequently visited by ornithologists as more than 540 species of birds have been described there in topic literature. The reserve has been designated an Important Bird Area (IBA) by BirdLife International. iT is one of the major targets for tourists and scientists who intend to explore the Gambia's manifold avifauna. Among the birds of BBWR, which include 268 species of 62 families, the Ramsar Information Sheet lists the following:

The reserve protects the habitat of many waterbirds. Among them are comb duck, spur-winged goose, white-faced whistling duck, garganey, northern pintail, African pygmy goose and the northern shoveler. The Aequornithes are represented by birds like western reef heron, little egret, woolly-necked stork, hammerkop, squacco heron, little bittern, Goliath heron, great egret, marabou, night heron, grey heron, cattle egret and the sacred ibis. With their long legs, many of these birds search the riverbanks for food. Of this group, the pink-backed pelican and African darter also live within the BBWR. The brackish water areas feature waders, of which spur-winged lapwing, little stint and common sandpiper can be found.

Among the colourful family of kingfishers, which preferably occur near open water, the woodland kingfisher, pied kingfisher, swallow-tailed bee-eater, giant kingfisher, malachite kingfisher and blue-breasted kingfisher are notable. Equally colourful are the west African examples of starlings; among them, the violet-backed starling and long-tailed glossy-starling can be found in the reserve. The Coraciiformes include the Abyssinian ground-hornbill and the European roller. Parrots include the Senegal parrot and rose-ringed parakeet. Birds of prey include species such as African fish eagle, red-necked buzzard, black kite and bateleur. The African mourning dove and little swift have been spotted.

=== Mammals and reptiles ===
Thirty-two species of mammals are known; the "Ramsar Information Sheet" lists the African clawless otter, which is common to the area. Several species of antelopes, such as sitatunga, bushbuck and duiker, as well as warthogs, are present. Among the predators, the spotted hyena is common, and leopards have been seen. Primates, according to the "Ramsar Information Sheet", include the red colobus, patas monkey, green monkey, Guinea baboon and Senegal bushbaby. The West African manatee lives in the water between the mangroves and is categorised as endangered. West African crocodiles are present.

=== Fish and other water animals ===
Among BBWR's ichthyofauna, some fish are noted in the "Ramsar Information Sheet": Ethmalosa fimbriata, barracudas (Sphyraena sp.), Polydactylus quadrifilis, Arius latiscutatus, Pseudotolithus elongatus, Pomadasys perotaei and Pseudotolithus bracygnathus. Also tilapia (Tilapia) and mullets (Mugilidae) occur in these waters. The West African mangrove oyster is present.

== Climate change ==
In 2022, the IPCC Sixth Assessment Report included Bao Bolong Wetland Reserve in the list of African natural heritage sites which would be threatened by flooding and coastal erosion by the end of the century, but only if climate change followed RCP 8.5, which is the scenario of high and continually increasing greenhouse gas emissions associated with the warming of over 4 °C., and is no longer considered very likely. The other, more plausible scenarios result in lower warming levels and consequently lower sea level rise: yet, sea levels would continue to increase for about 10,000 years under all of them. Even if the warming is limited to 1.5 °C, global sea level rise is still expected to exceed 2–3 m (7–10 ft) after 2000 years (and higher warming levels will see larger increases by then), consequently exceeding 2100 levels of sea level rise under RCP 8.5 (~0.75 m (2 ft) with a range of 0.5–1 m (2–3 ft)) well before the year 4000.

== Tourism ==
The area is only moderately used for tourism. Ecotourism, including birdwatching and common observations of nature, shall be further developed though. Next to this, boat tours through the mangroves are conducted.
