= Denton Bridge (The Gambia) =

Bridge in the Gambia

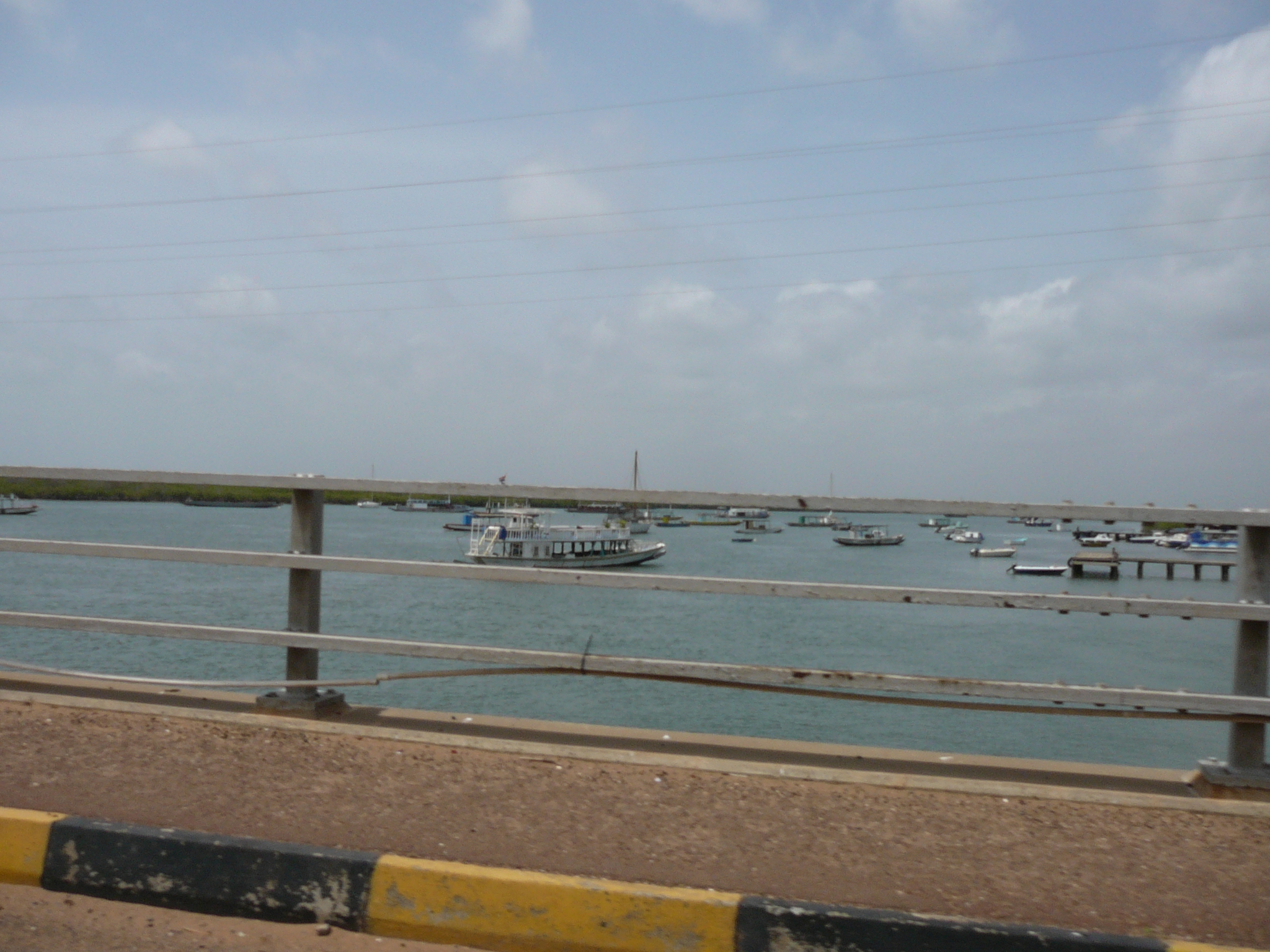
- View from Denton Bridge
- Coordinates: 13°28′04.3″N 16°37′40.7″W
- Crosses: Tanbi Wetland Complex
- Named for: Sir George Chardin Denton

Characteristics
- Total length: 210
- Width: 20
- No. of lanes: 4

History
- Opened: 1986

Location
- Interactive map of Denton Bridge

Denton Bridge is a prominent bridge in The Gambia that connects the capital city of Banjul, located on St. Mary's Island, to the mainland. Named after Sir George Chardin Denton, the former Governor of Gambia, the bridge has a span of 210 m and crosses over the Tanbi Wetland Complex. The bridge is a girder bridge that opened in 1986 and is the sole roadway connecting the mainland to Banjul, with the only other method of entrance being a ferry from Barra.

The new structure replaced an older bridge, built in 1915 and renovated in 1959, located 25 meters further north. This approximately nine-meter-wide bridge is now decommissioned and no longer in use.

== See also ==
- Transport in the Gambia
