= List of national parks of the Gambia =

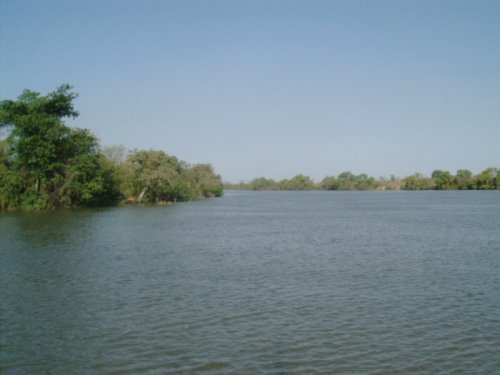
Baboon island in the Gambia River, part of River Gambia National Park

The Gambia has the following National parks and nature reserves, managed by the Department of Parks and Wildlife Management:

Park / reserve	Area (ha)	Established	Notes
Abuko Nature Reserve	105	1916	The country's first designated wildlife reserve.
Bao Bolong Wetland Reserve	22,000	1996	The first reserve in the Gambia to be acknowledged as a wetland area worth of protection according to the Ramsar Convention.
Kiang West National Park	11,000	1987	One of the largest and most important wildlife reserves in the Gambia.
Niumi National Park	4,940	1986	On the coast, contiguous with Senegal's Delta du Saloum National Park and Biosphere Reserve.
River Gambia National Park	570	1978	A chimpanzee reserve, off-limits to visitors.
Tanbi Wetland Complex	4,500	2001	
Tanji Bird Reserve	612	1993	

== See also ==
- Farasuto Forest Community Nature Reserve, the Gambia
