= Tanji Bird Reserve =

Bird reserve in the Gambia

- IUCN category II (national park)
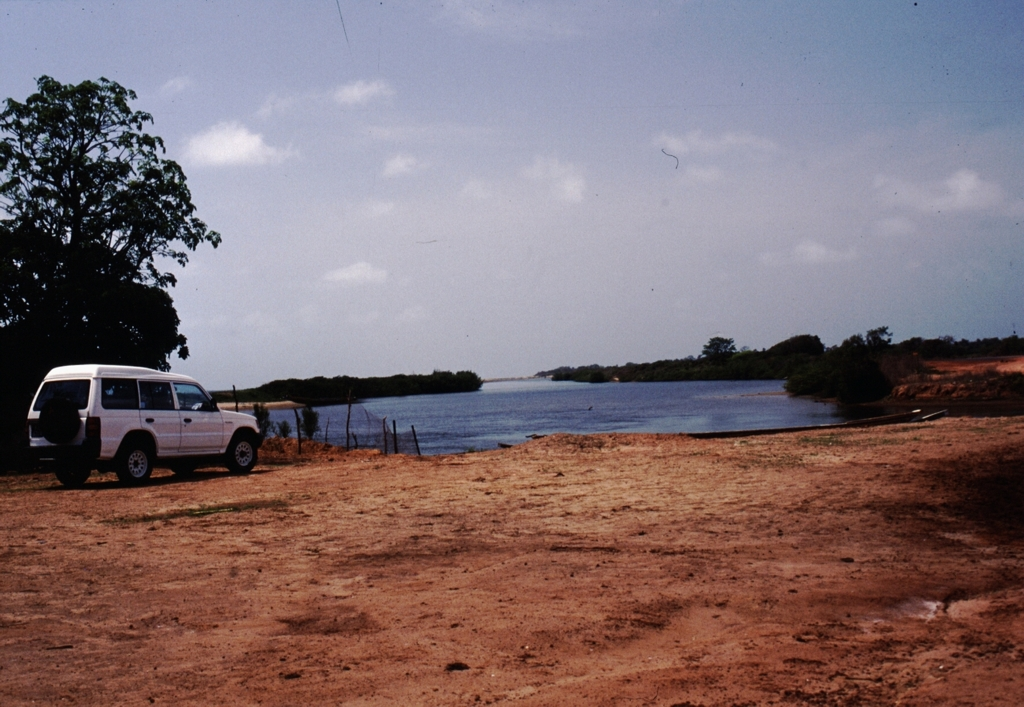
- Interactive map of Tanji Bird Reserve
- Location: Gambia
- Coordinates: 13°22′0″N 16°47′43″W
- Area: 612 ha (1,510 acres)
- Established: 1993

The Tanji Bird Reserve is a bird reserve in The Gambia. Established in 1993, it covers an area of 612 hectares (1,510 acres). It is also known as Karinti, the Tanji River Reserve or the Tanji National Park.

== Location ==
The Tanji Bird Reserve lies 3 km to the north of the fishing village of Tanji and includes the Karinti River. The protected reserve, which incorporates an area of the Bald Cape and the Bijol Islands (Kajonyi Islands), is located 1.5 km from the Atlantic Ocean coastline. The Bijol Islands are The Gambia's only offshore islands. The Bijol Island consist of two islands which are joined together at low tide.

== Habitat ==
The Tanji Bird Reserve incorporates mangrove, dry woodland and coastal dune scrub woodland. Along the coastal part there is a series of lagoons, and off shore Bijol islands which are important sites for breeding marine turtles and for roosting birds.

== Wildlife ==
The Tanji Bird Reserve has had around 300 species of birds recorded within it, including 82 species of Palearctic migrants. The reserve has been declared as an Important Bird Area by Birdlife International. Species seen regularly on the reserve's lagoons include Black-headed heron, white-fronted plover, Caspian tern, spur-winged plover, sanderling, Western reef heron, West African crested tern and lesser black-backed gull. While the Bijol Islands are an important feeding and roosting area for substantial numbers of shorebirds, seabirds, ospreys, and other birds, including Gambia's only breeding seabirds, including colonies of grey-headed gulls, slender-billed gulls, royal terns, Caspian terns, long-tailed cormorants and Western reef herons.

The reserve also supports a rich insect biota. A 2019 survey discovered 31 species of termites, including 19 known nowhere else in Gambia and suggesting a need for redefinition of certain groups.

== Management ==
The reserve has been subject to slash-and-burn harvest by residents of Brufut, who expressed resentment about the establishment of the reserve without their vote and for it being named for a smaller coastal town of Tanji that relied less on the resources within the reserve. This has led to a decrease, though not an extirpation, of most tree species within the reserve. However, residents also near-universally expressed support for being involved in the management of the reserve in a study conducted by researchers from Dalhousie University in 2001.
