= Terminalia albida =

Scientific classification
- Kingdom: Plantae
- Clade: Tracheophytes
- Clade: Angiosperms
- Clade: Eudicots
- Clade: Rosids
- Order: Myrtales
- Family: Combretaceae
- Genus: Terminalia
- Species: T. albida

Binomial name
- Terminalia albida Scott-Elliot

Synonyms
- Terminalia argyrophylla Pott. & Prain

Species of tree

Terminalia albida is a tree species in the genus Terminalia found in West Africa. It is found in the savannah part of Bao Bolong Wetland Reserve in Gambia.

The aqueous extract of the bark is used in Gambia as an eye-lotion.
