= Tanji =

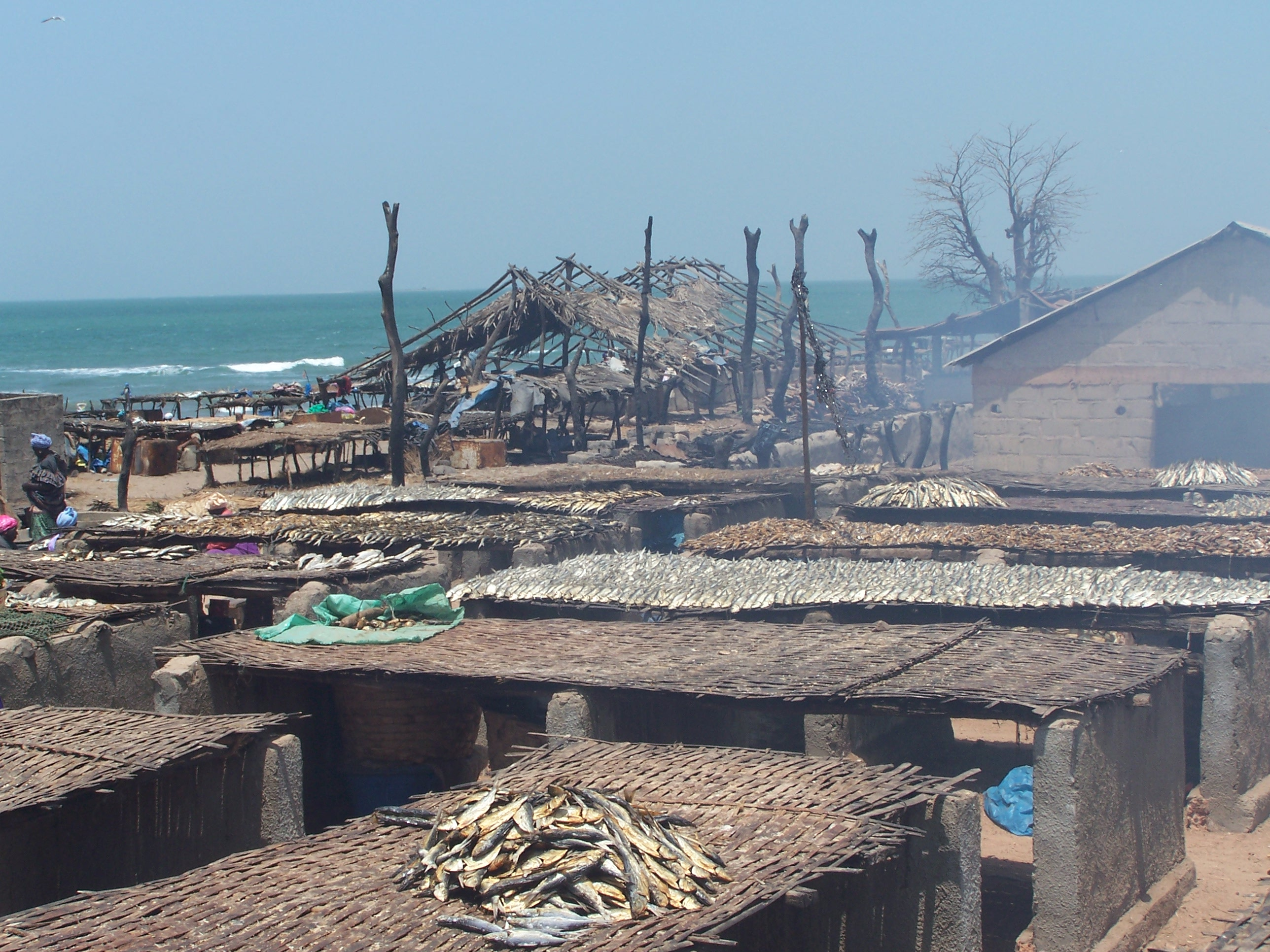
- Fish being smoked in Tanji

- Location in the Gambia
- Coordinates: 13°21′N 16°47′W
- Country: The Gambia
- Division: Western Division
- Time zone: GMT

Tanji is a town in Gambia, along the Atlantic coast. It is primarily a fishing town with a population of 14,531 according to the 2013 population census. The population of the town has been growing dramatically due to urban and rural migration, drawn by the fishing industry and suitable location. The Tanje Village Museum is where artisans and craftsmen engage in traditional crafts. The Tanji Bird Reserve is located 3 kilometers from the village.

A survey of fisherman determined 95% worked in unsafe conditions, and 85% had experienced work-related injuries. The north coast, where it forms an estuary with the Gambia River, is the home to six species of Cone snail, including four in the Lautoconus genus found nowhere else in the world.
