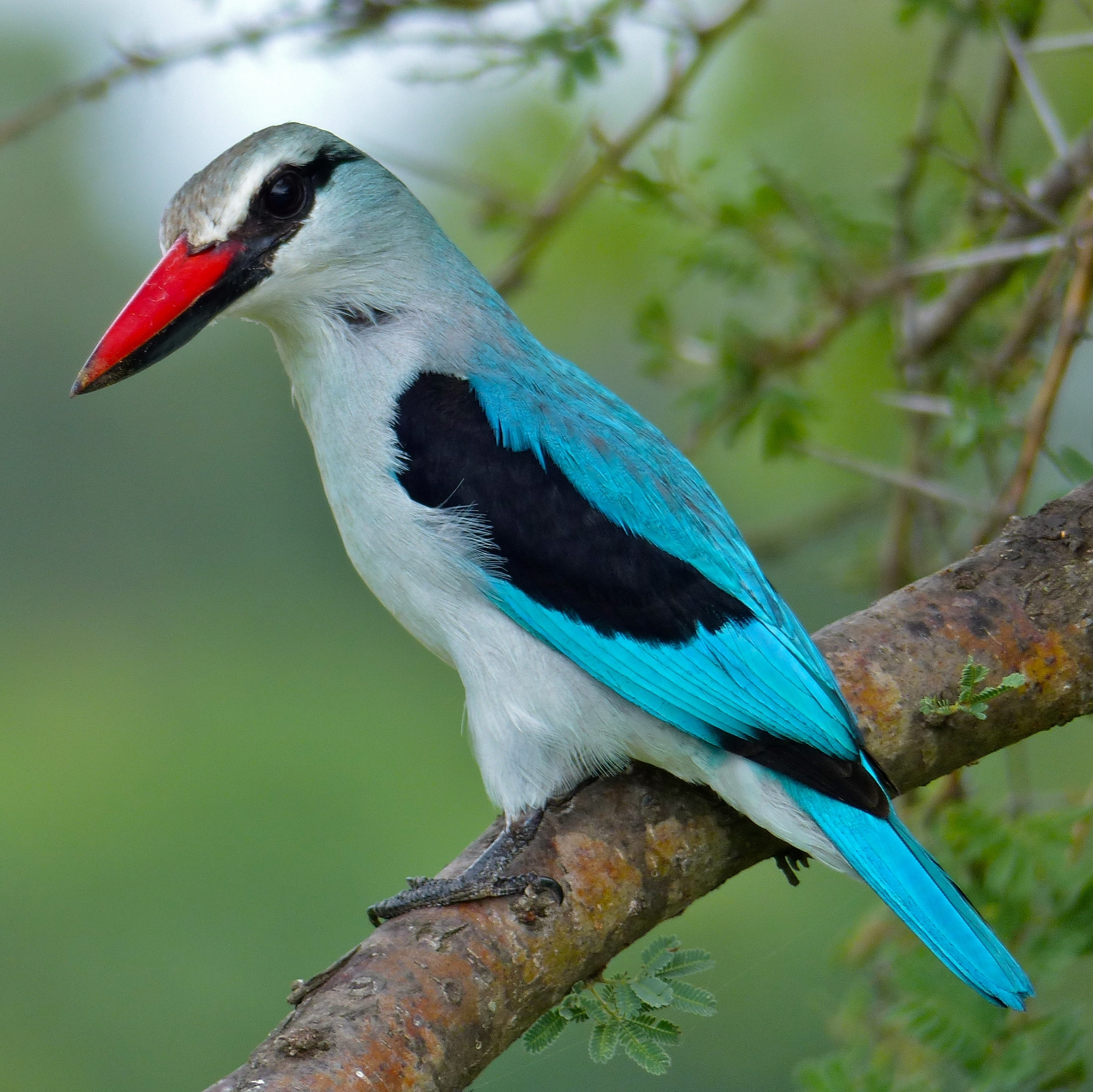
- Halcyon senegalensis cyanoleuca and its call in South Africa

Conservation status
- Least Concern (IUCN 3.1)

Scientific classification
- Kingdom: Animalia
- Phylum: Chordata
- Class: Aves
- Order: Coraciiformes
- Family: Alcedinidae
- Subfamily: Halcyoninae
- Genus: Halcyon
- Species: H. senegalensis

Binomial name
- Halcyon senegalensis (Linnaeus, 1766)

Synonyms
- Alcedo senegalensis Linnaeus, 1766

= Woodland kingfisher =

Species of bird

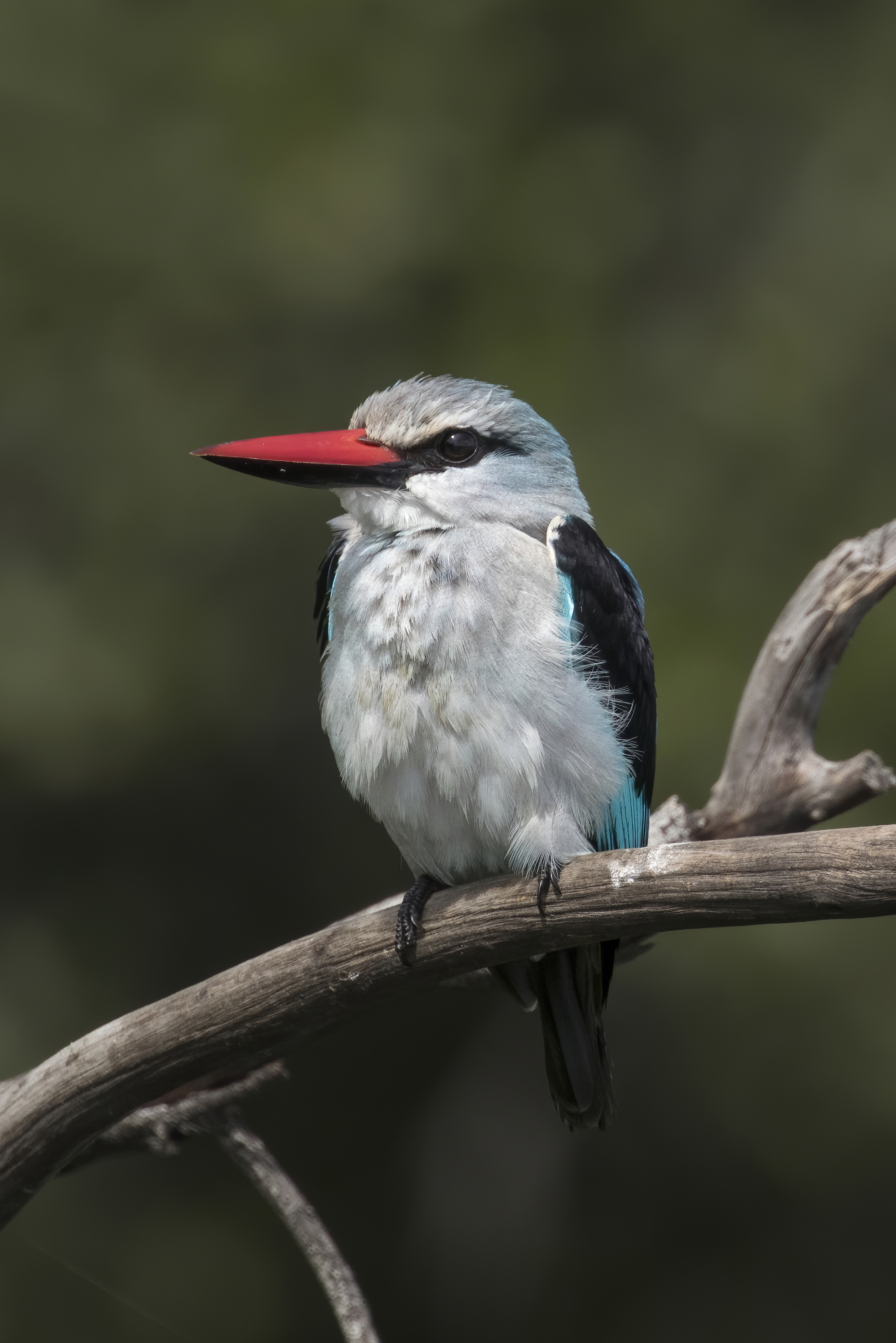
in Namibia

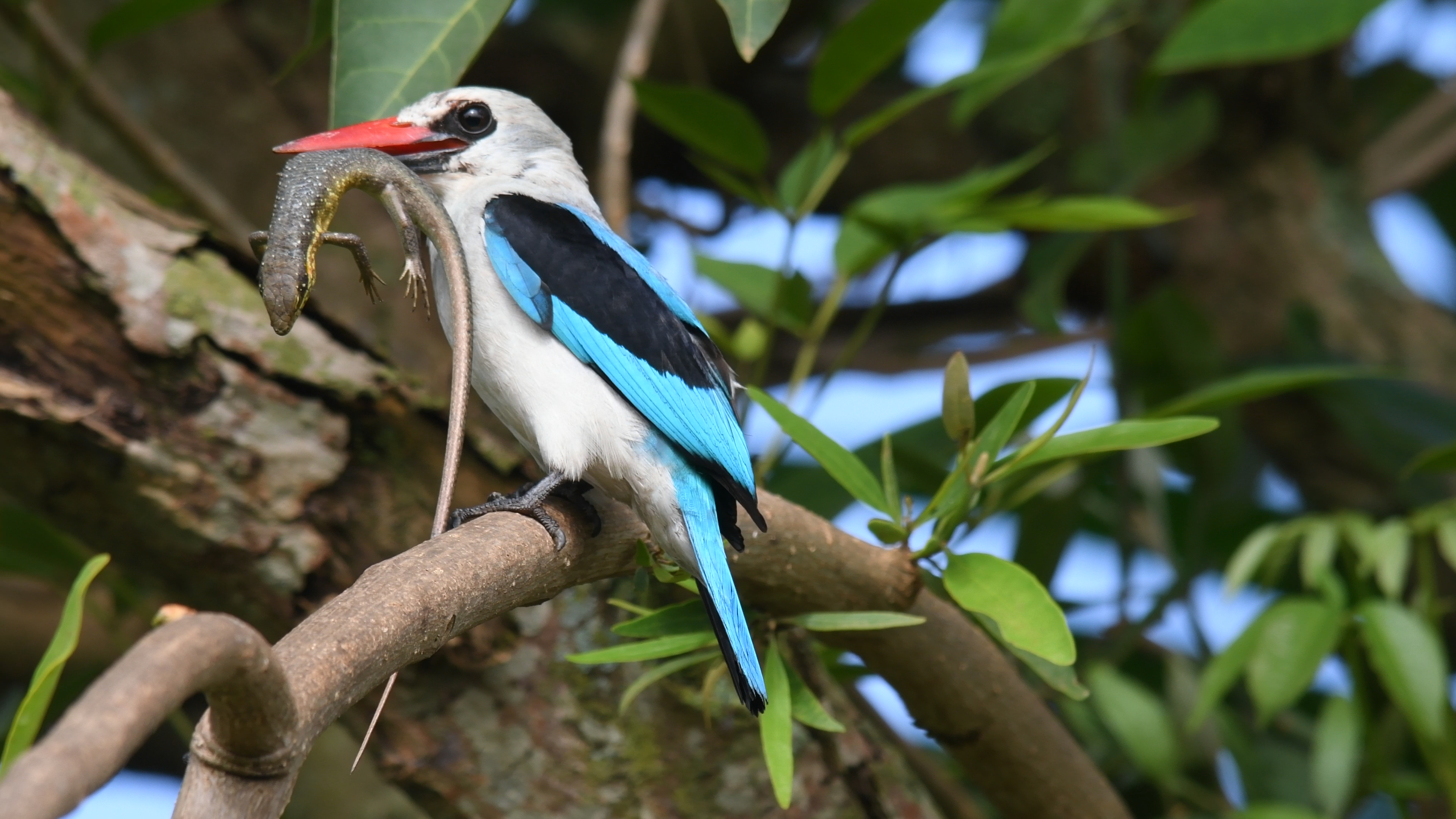
in Uganda

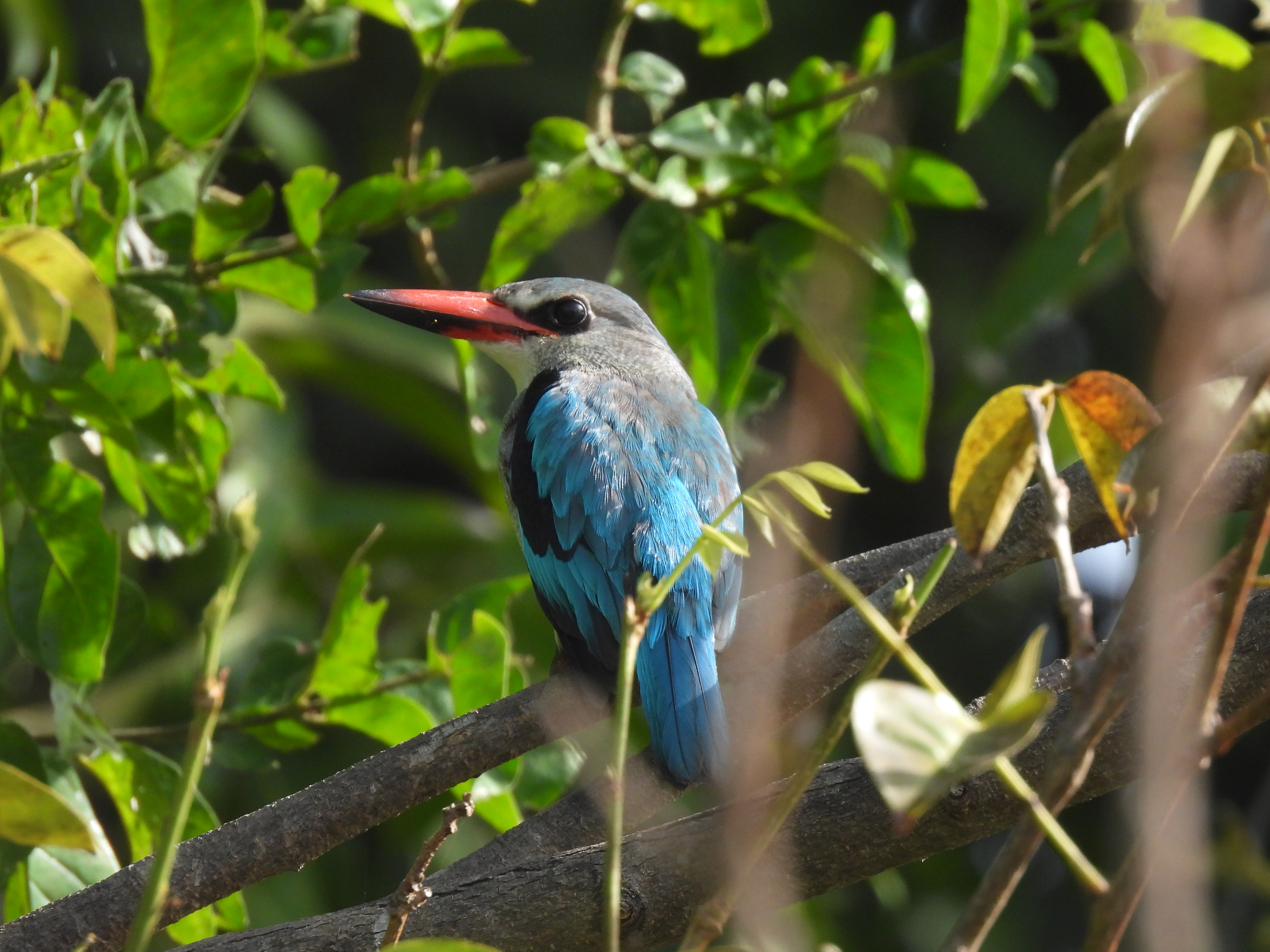
In The Gambia

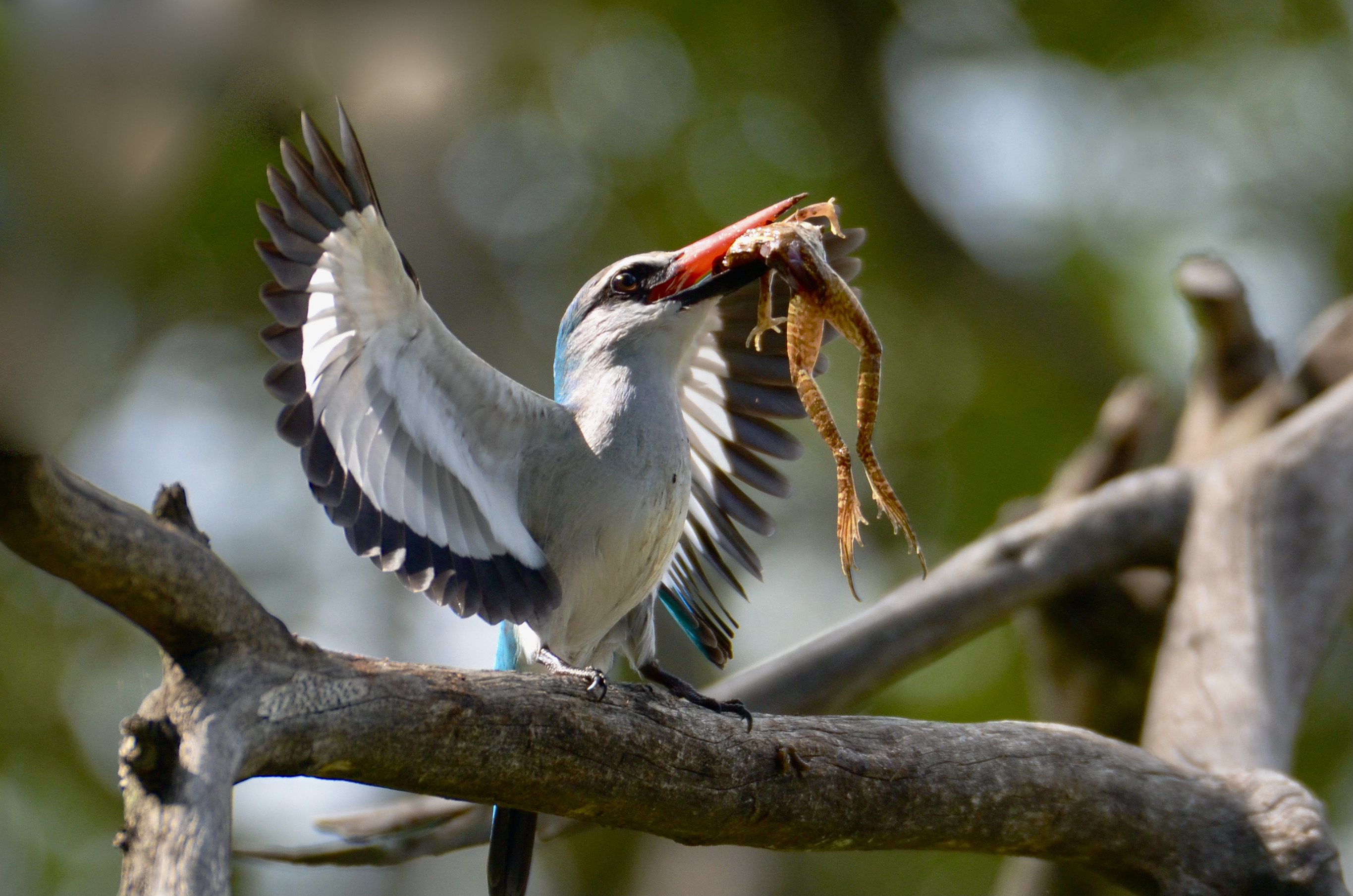

The woodland kingfisher (Halcyon senegalensis) is a tree kingfisher that is widely distributed in Africa south of the Sahara.

== Taxonomy ==
The Swedish naturalist Carl Linnaeus included the woodland kingfisher with the binomial name Alcedo senegalensis in the twelfth edition of his Systema Naturae which was published in 1766. Linnaeus based his formal description on "Le Grand Martin-Pescher du Sénégal" that the French naturalist Mathurin Jacques Brisson had described and illustrated in 1760. The current genus Halcyon was introduced by the English naturalist and artist William Swainson in 1821, with the woodland kingfisher as the type species.

Three subspecies are recognised:

- H. s. fuscopileus Reichenow, 1906 – Sierra Leone to south Nigeria and south to DR Congo and north Angola
- H. s. senegalensis (Linnaeus, 1766) – Senegal and Gambia to Ethiopia and north Tanzania
- H. s. cyanoleuca (Vieillot, 1818) – south Angola and west Tanzania to South Africa

== Description ==
This is a medium-sized kingfisher, 23 cm (9.1 in) in length. The adult has a bright blue back, wing panel and tail. Its head, neck and underparts are white, and its shoulders are black. The flight of the woodland kingfisher is rapid and direct. The large bill has a red upper mandible and black lower mandible. The legs and feet are dark grey. Some birds may have greyish heads, causing confusion with mangrove kingfisher.

However, the lores are dark, creating a dark stripe through the eye (the stripe does not extend through the eye in mangrove kingfisher), and the underwing, primaries and secondaries are black with white underwing coverts (there is a black carpal patch on the white coverts in mangrove kingfisher). The inner webs of the base of the flight feathers are white, creating an indistinct white wingbar (white completely absent from wings in mangrove kingfisher). The breast is white (tends to be much greyer in mangrove kingfisher). The sexes are similar, but juveniles are duller than adults and have a brown bill.

The call of this noisy kingfisher is a loud trill sounding like a nail run down the teeth of a comb.

== Distribution and habitat ==
The woodland kingfisher is widely distributed in tropical Africa south of the Sahara and from Pretoria northwards. This kingfisher is essentially resident within 8° of the equator, but northern and southern populations are migratory, moving into the equatorial zone in the dry season.

It is a common species of a variety of wooded habitats with some trees, especially Acacias, including around human habitation. Although it is a "kingfisher", it prefers drier habitats in more traditional woodland and can be far from water. It is often solitary but can occur in small groups.

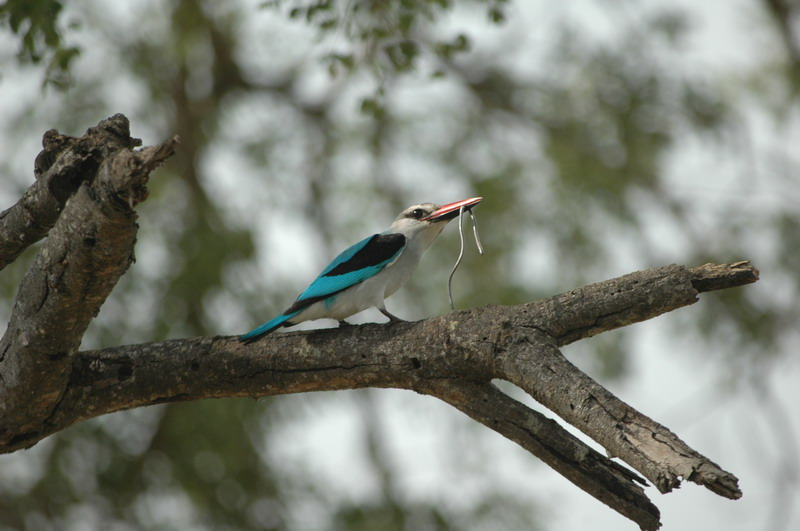
With thread snake prey in South Africa

== Behaviour ==
The woodland kingfisher is aggressively territorial, attacking intruders including humans. It has a striking display in which the wings are spread to show the white linings.

=== Breeding ===
The nest is a tree hole excavated by a woodpecker or barbet. A single clutch of three round white eggs is typical. The young are cared for by both parents for up to five weeks after leaving the nest. Woodland Kingfisher breeding in the Transvaal takes place from November until March, peaking in December and January.

=== Feeding ===
It hunts from an exposed perch, often on a dead branch of a tree, or perches quietly in semi-shade while seeking food.

=== Interspecific relationships ===
The medium-sized, electric-blue-backed kingfisher distribution overlaps almost everywhere with the Brown-hooded Kingfisher H. albiventris, and they frequently occur alongside each other. Although it is similar to the Mangrove Kingfisher in appearance, the two are largely allopatric, use different habitats and differ in diet.
