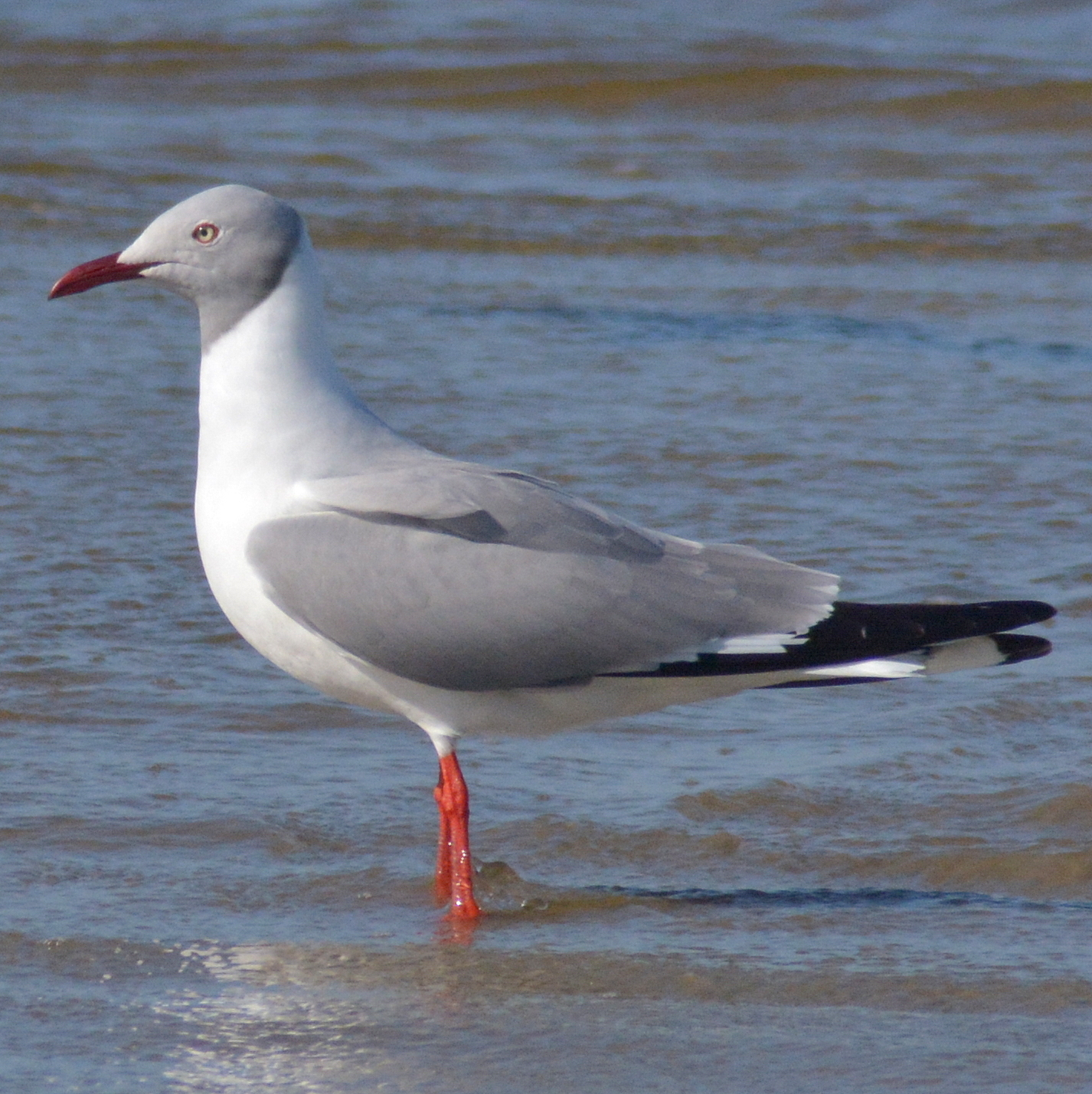
- Breeding adult C. c. cirrocephalus, Rio Grande do Sul, Brazil
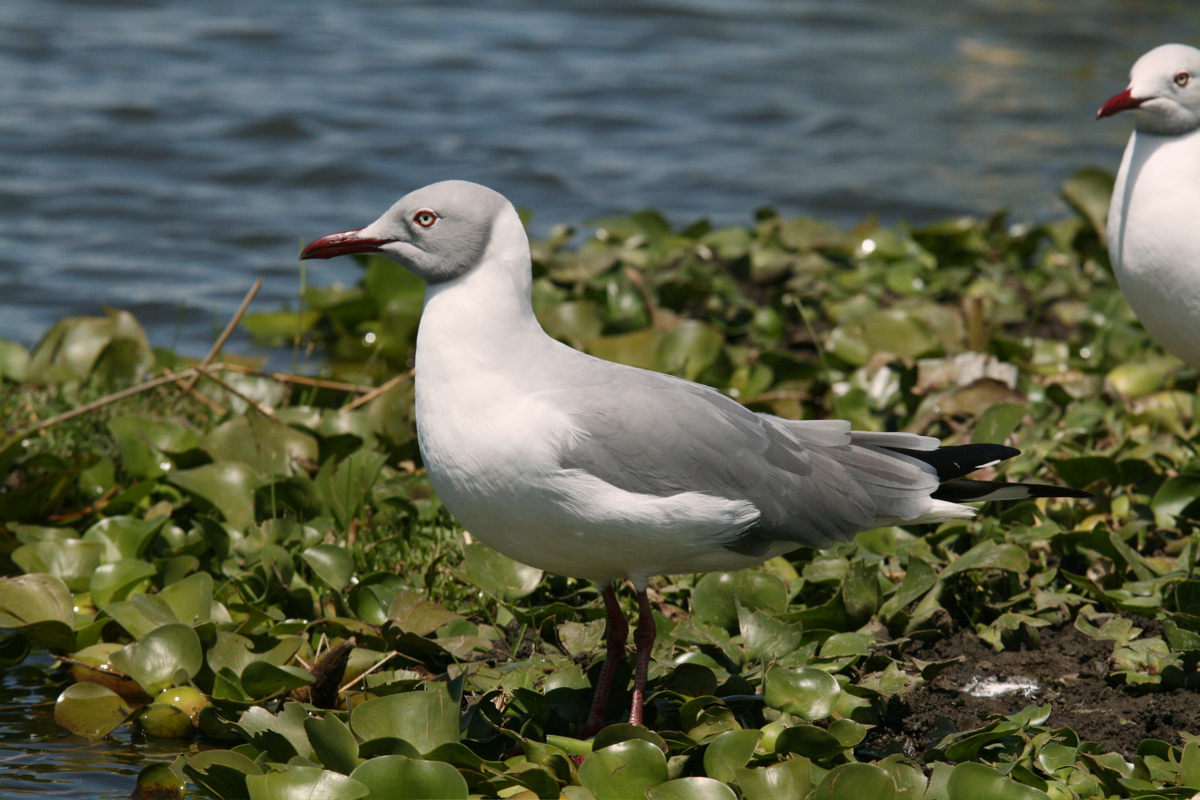
- Breeding adult C. c. poiocephalus, Lake Naivasha, Kenya

Conservation status
- Least Concern (IUCN 3.1)

Scientific classification
- Kingdom: Animalia
- Phylum: Chordata
- Class: Aves
- Order: Charadriiformes
- Family: Laridae
- Genus: Chroicocephalus
- Species: C. cirrocephalus

Binomial name
- Chroicocephalus cirrocephalus (Vieillot, 1818)
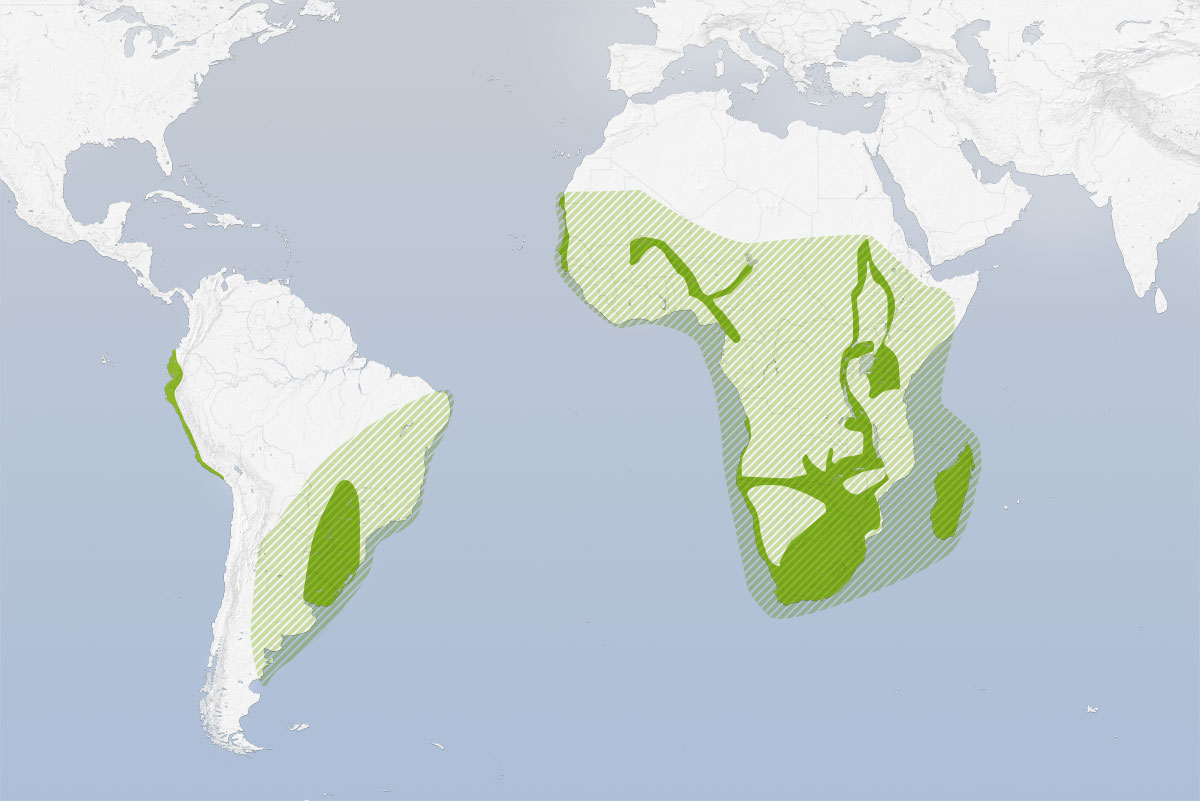
- range resident vagrant

Synonyms
- Larus cirrocephalus

= Grey-headed gull =

Species of bird

The grey-headed gull (Chroicocephalus cirrocephalus), also known as the grey-hooded gull, is a small species of gull which breeds patchily in South America and Africa south of the Sahara. It is not truly migratory, but is dispersive, becoming more widespread in winter. This species has occurred as a rare vagrant to the United States, Italy, and Spain. As is the case with many gulls, it had traditionally been placed in the genus Larus. Recent evidence suggests the South American and African populations may represent two separate cryptic species.

== Description ==
The grey-headed gull is slightly larger than the black-headed gull at 42 cm length. The summer adult has a pale grey head, a grey body, slightly darker in tone than in black-headed gull, and red bill and legs. The black tips to the primary wing feathers have conspicuous white "mirrors". The underwing is dark grey with black wingtips. The grey hood is lost in winter, leaving just two dark smudges around and behind the eye. The eye is dark in immatures, but has a white iris in adults. The sexes are similar. It takes two years to reach maturity; first year birds have a black terminal tail band, and more dark areas in the wings. In flight, the wings are broader than those of black-headed gull. It is a noisy species, especially at colonies. The call is a raucous crow-like caw, caw.

It is locally abundant, breeding in large colonies in reedbeds and marshes; it lays two or three eggs in a nest, which can be on the ground or floating. Like most gulls, it is highly gregarious in winter, both when feeding and in evening roosts. Although it is predominantly coastal or estuarine, it is not a pelagic species, and is rarely seen at sea far from land. Flocks numbering hundreds or thousands can form when the feeding conditions are appropriate.

== Taxonomy ==
Currently, two subspecies are accepted:

- C. c. cirrocephalus (Vieillot, 1818) – South America
- C. c. poiocephalus (Swainson, 1837) – Africa

They are scarcely distinguishable, with the South American subspecies slightly larger and paler-backed than the African subspecies, and with a marginally larger white spot ("mirror") on the two outer primaries. Recent genetic evidence however suggests however that they may represent two separate species, as the African subspecies C. c. poiocephalus may be more closely related to the (also African) Hartlaub's gull C. hartlaubii, than it is to the nominate South American C. c. cirrocephalus; if verified, this would require the splitting of the African taxon as a separate species to avoid paraphyly. This has however not yet (as of 2024) been adopted by the IOC World Bird List.

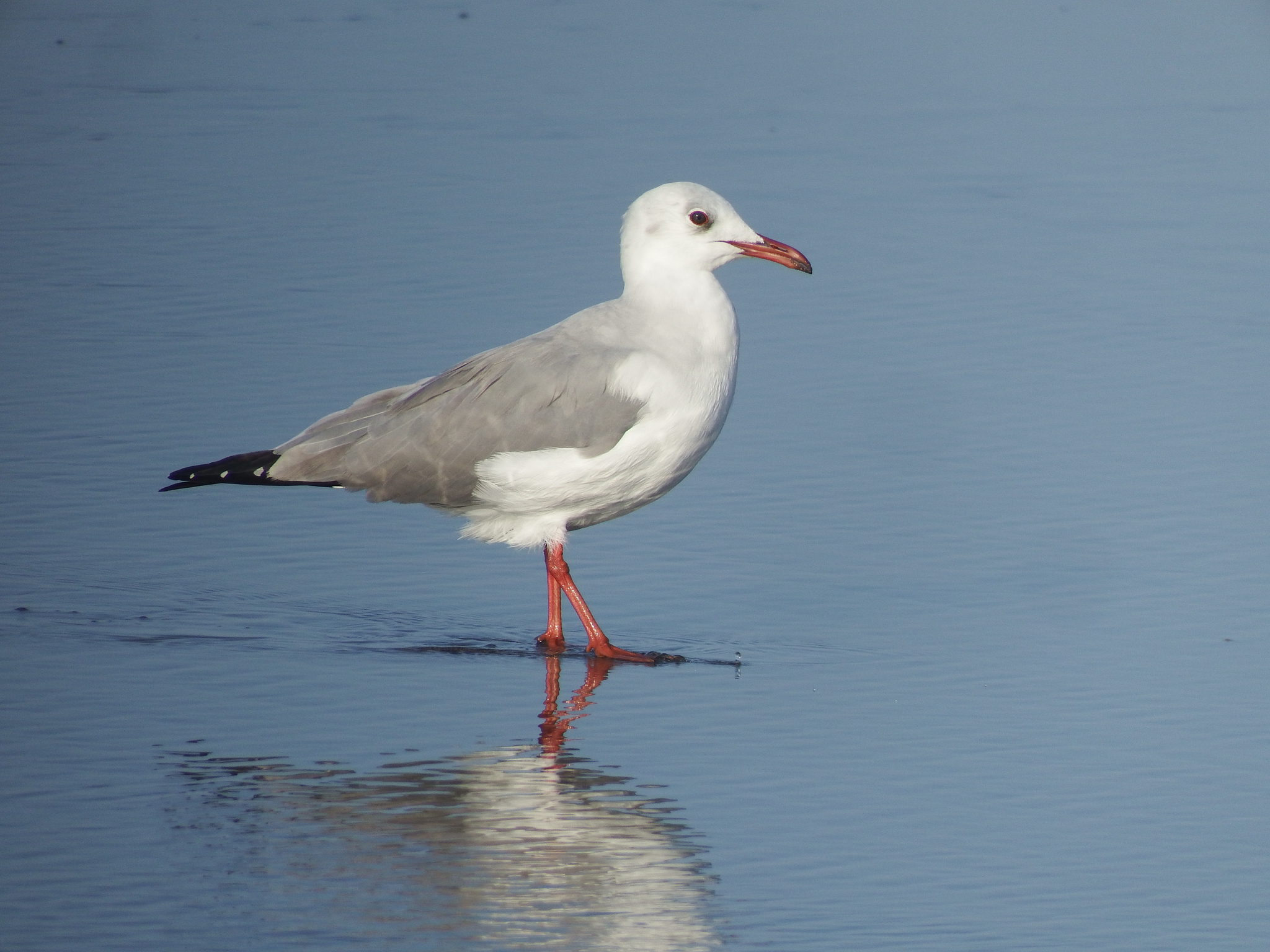
C. c. cirrocephalus in non-breeding plumage, Mejía, Peru

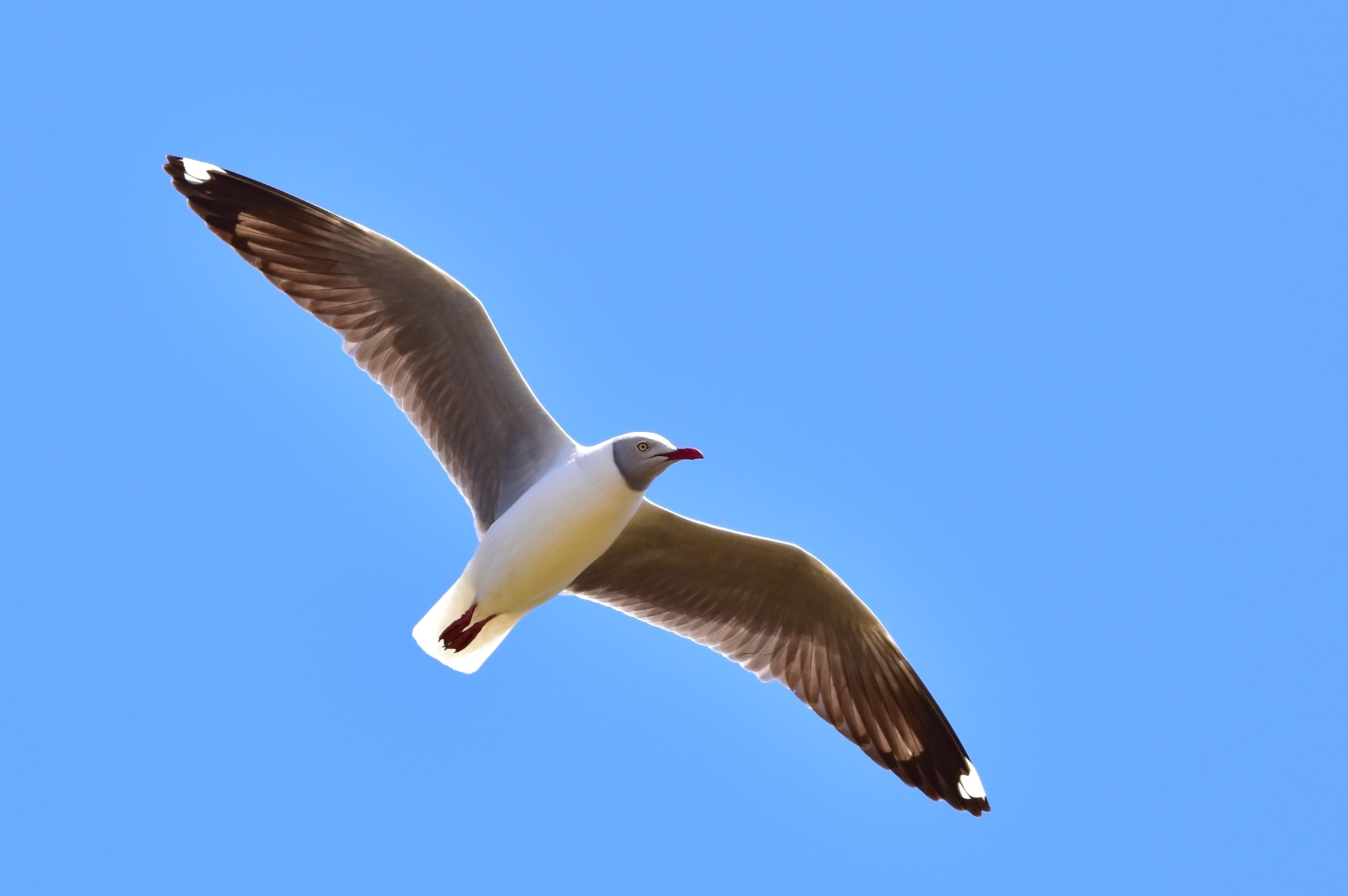
C. c. cirrocephalus in flight in breeding plumage, Uruguay

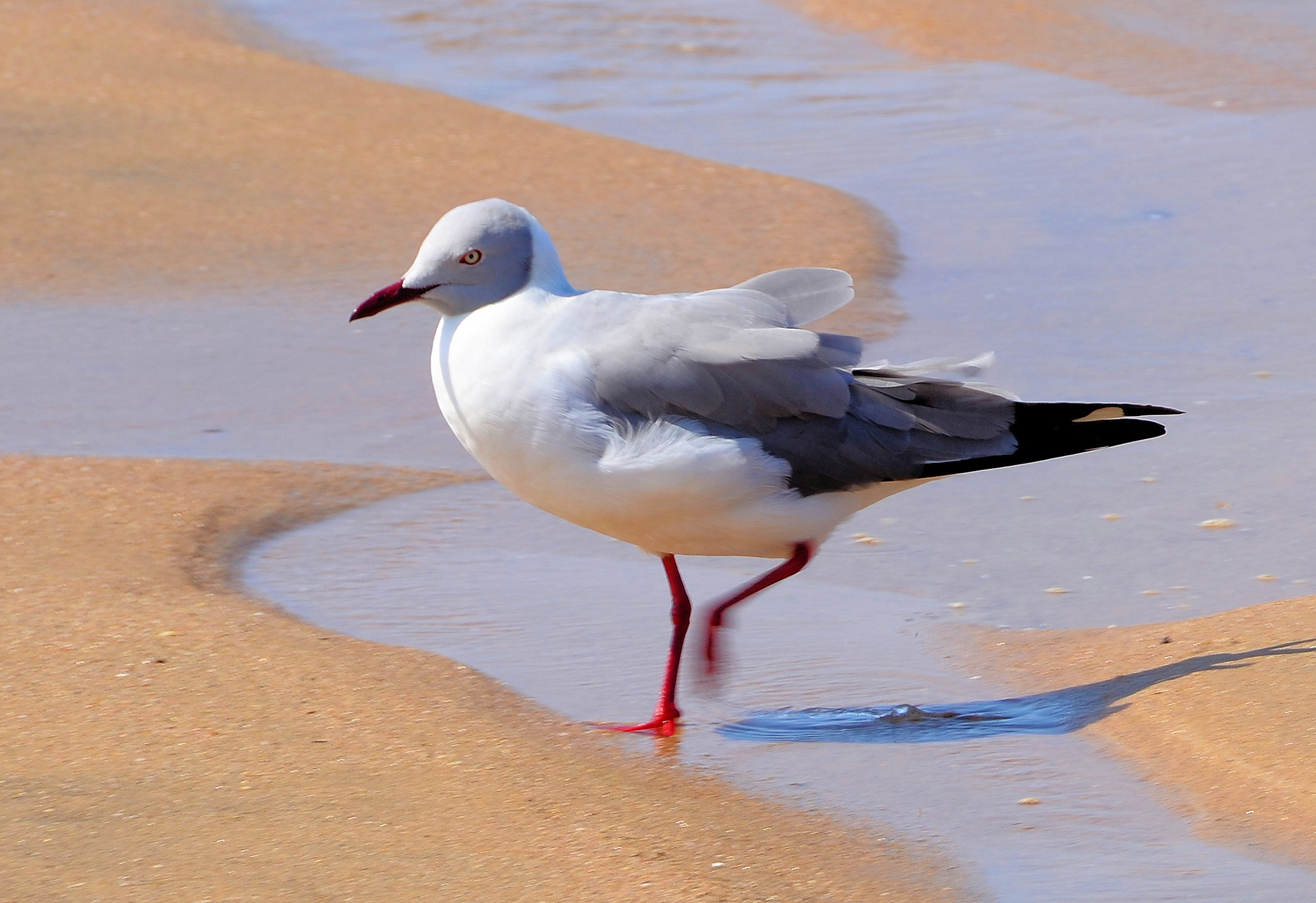
C. c. poiocephalus at Cape Vidal, South Africa

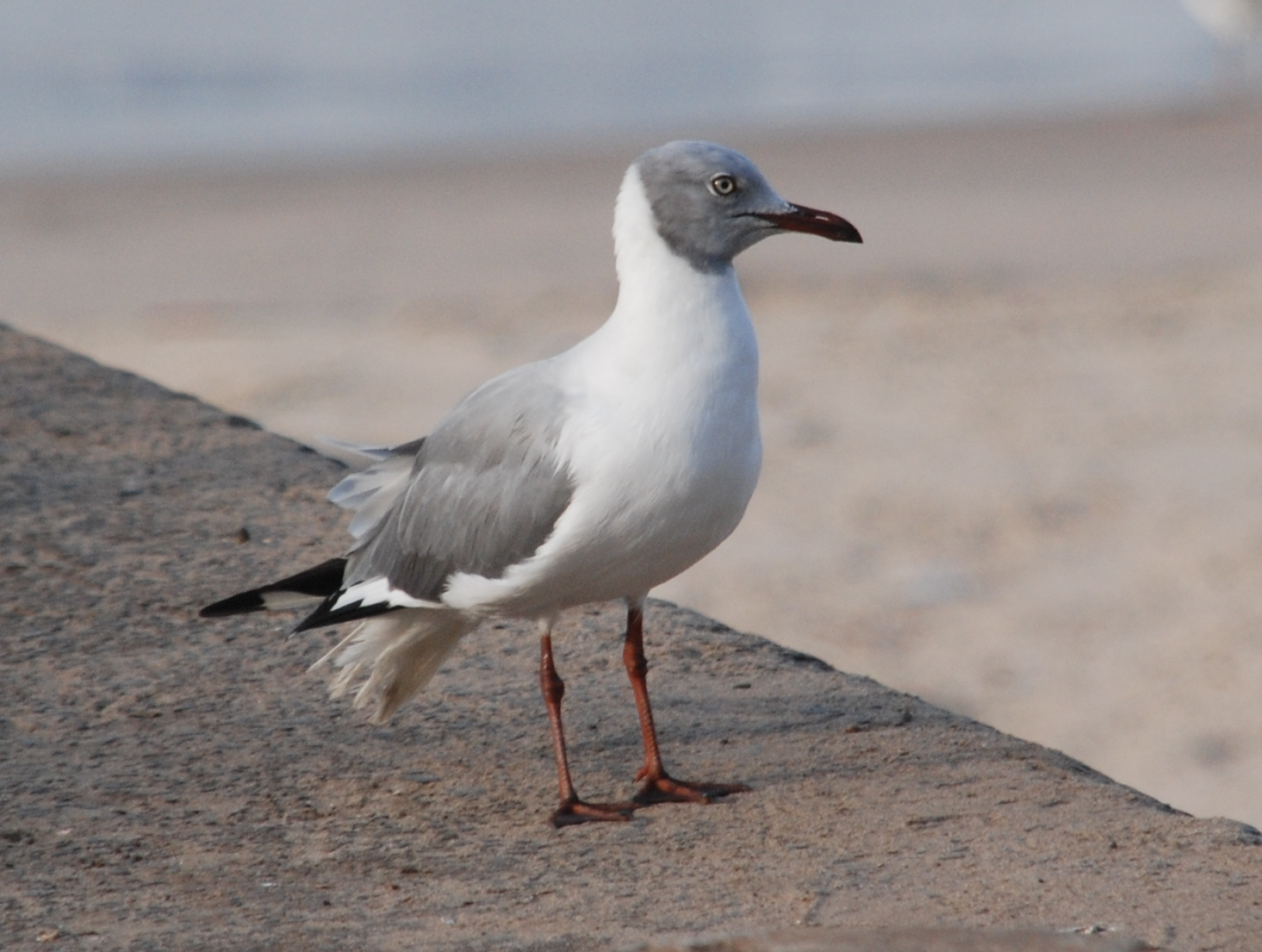
C. c. poiocephalus in breeding plumage, Bakau, Gambia

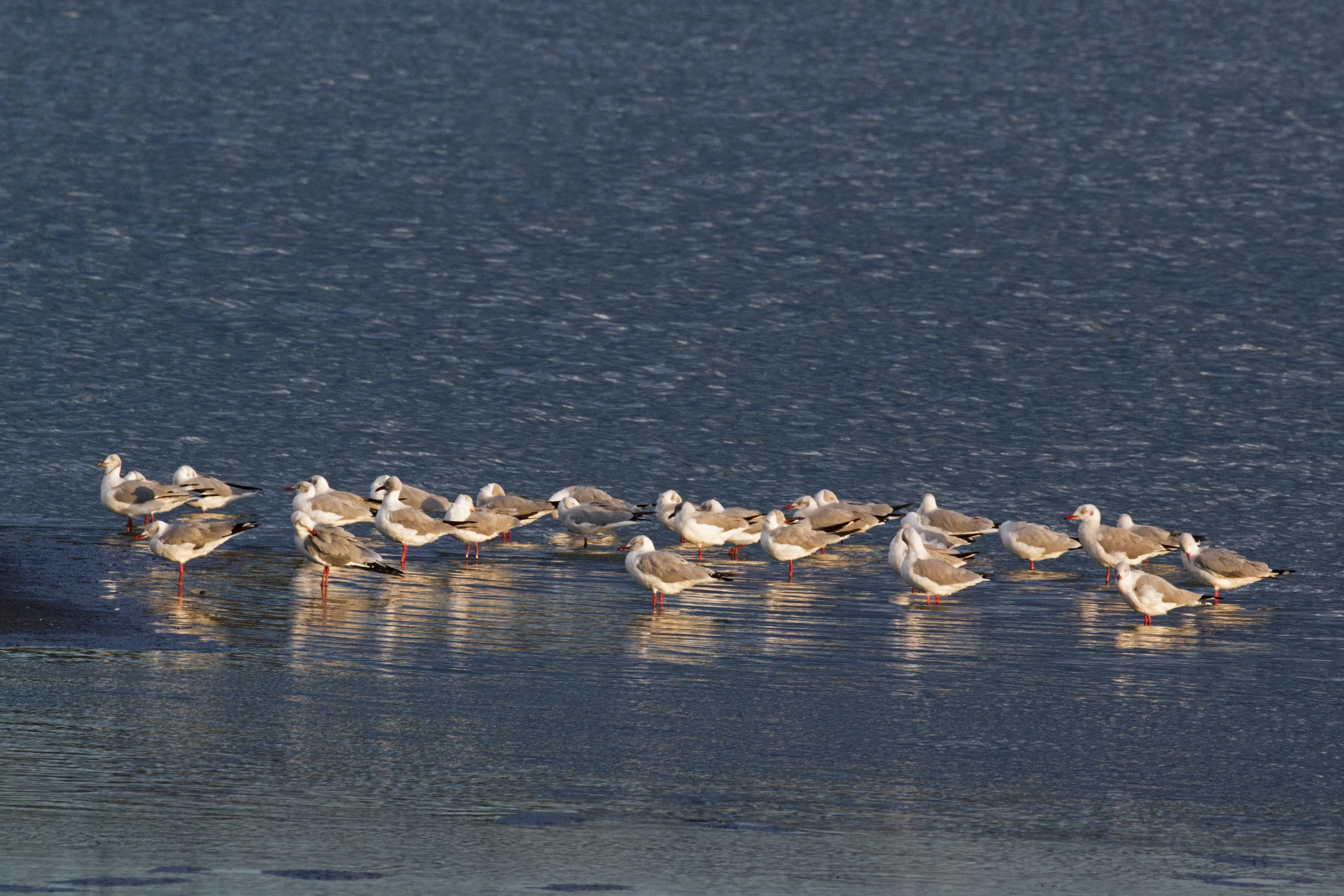
C. c. poiocephalus flock, Lake Elementaita, Kenya

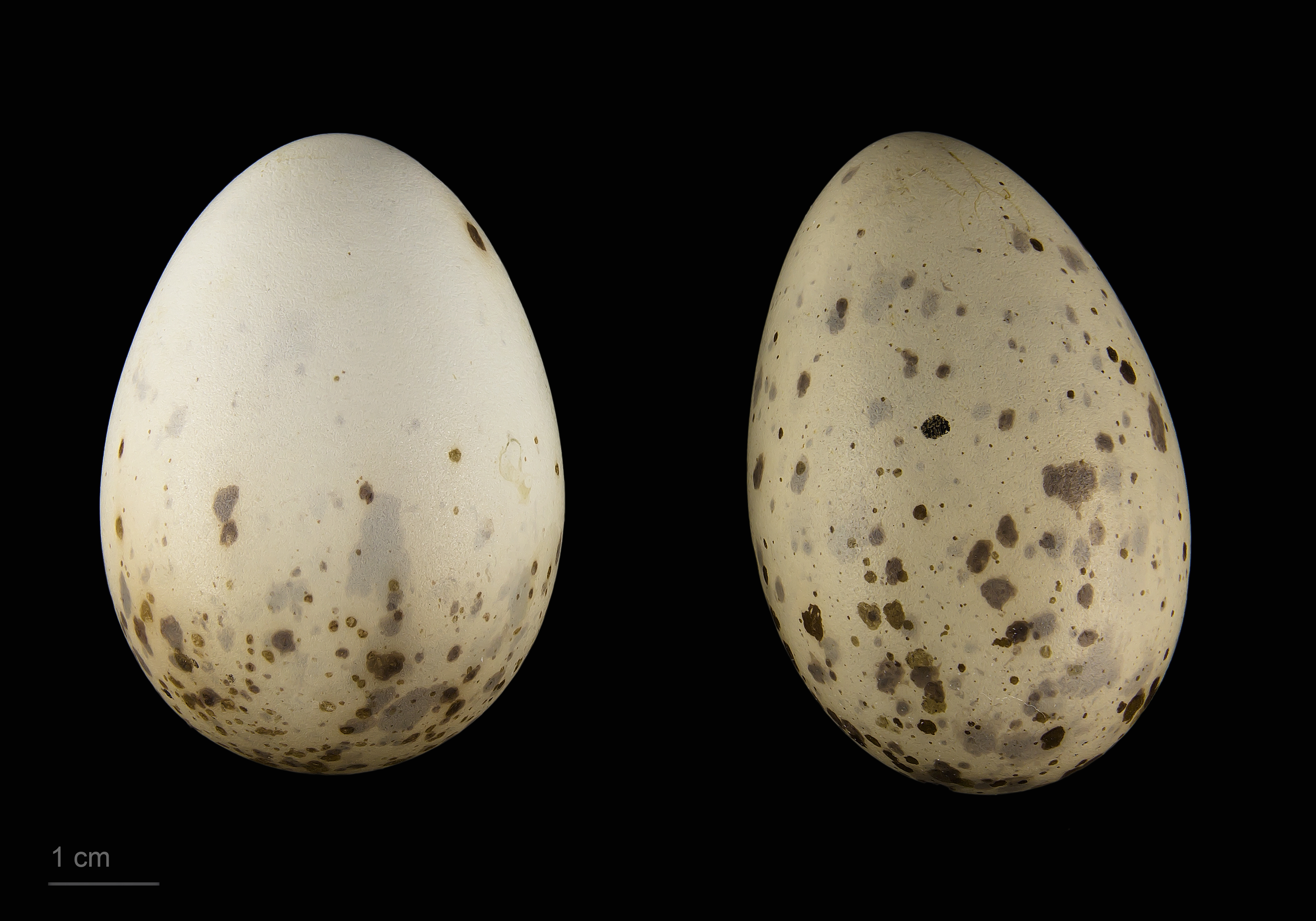
Eggs of C. c. poiocephalus from Banc d'Arguin, Mauritania - MHNT
