= Tanbi Wetland Complex =

Protected area in the Gambia

- IUCN category II (national park)
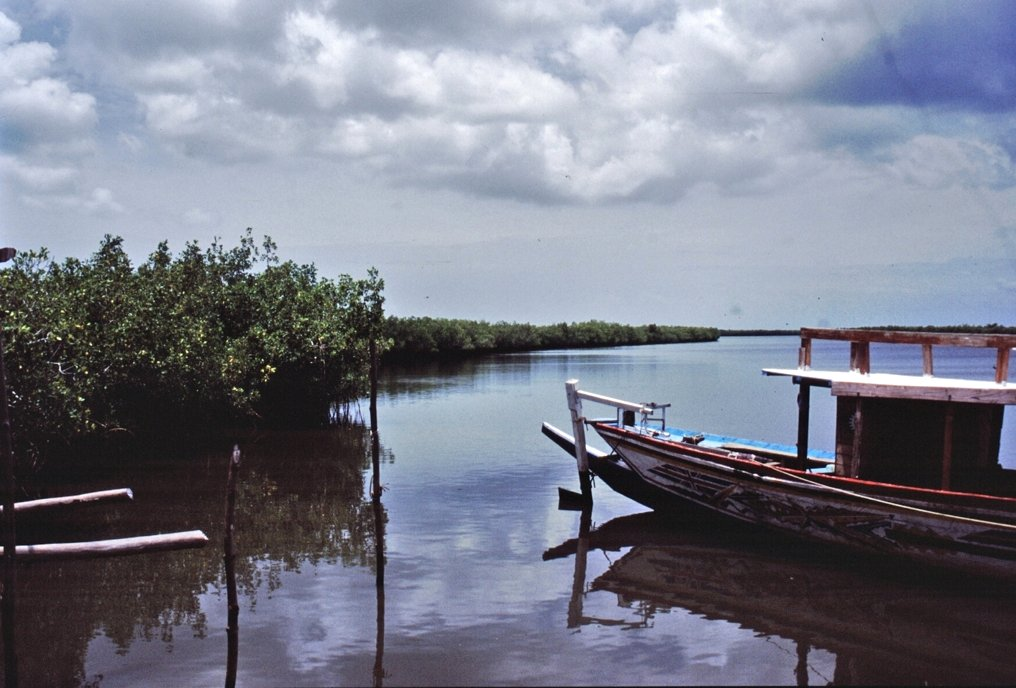
- Interactive map of Tanbi Wetland Complex
- Location: Gambia
- Coordinates: 13°25′00″N 16°37′00″W
- Area: 4,500 ha (11,000 acres)
- Established: 2001

Ramsar Wetland
- Designated: 2 February 2007
- Reference no.: 1657

The Tanbi Wetland Complex is a wetland reserve in the Gambia, established in 2001 outside the national capital of Banjul.

== Geography ==
The wilderness site of the Tanbi Wetland Complex lies on the southern channel at the mouth of the Gambia River. It covers an area of about 6,000 ha, of which mangroves make up 4,800 ha, located to the west and south-west of Banjul. The northernmost portion of the complex skirts the Kankujeri Road and includes Cape Creek. It encompasses the western shores of St Mary Island and extends to the south-east towards Lamin and Mandinari Village. It was declared a Ramsar site in February 2007.

=== Flora and habitat ===
Eighty per cent of the Tanbi Wetland Complex is composed of mangrove forest which is made up of several species of mangroves, including Avicennia africana, Conocarpus erectus, Laguncularia racemosa, Annona glabra and Rhizophora spp., with the occasional baobab and Borassus aethiopum palm standing on the drier ground. The vegetation gradually changes to the west and south into bare flats, saltmarsh and dry woodland, with agricultural land encroaching around the fringes of the complex. There is a latticework of tidal creeks, known to locals as bolongs, as well as tidal lagoons and estuarial saline mudflats.

The complex has a role in retaining incoming water and rainfall, stabilising the shoreline, the retention of sediments and nutrients, and also controlling their erosion, ground water replenishment and flood control; so the Tanbi Wetlands act as a hydrological buffer zone for the Banjul region.

=== Fauna ===
The complex is home to small monkeys, including troops of the western red colobus. Other mammals recorded include the West African manatee, marsh mongoose and African clawless otter. There are West African crocodiles as well as various snakes and lizards. It is an important breeding area for the shrimp Farfantepenaeus notialis.

Over 360 species of bird have been recorded in the complex, including Pel’s fishing owls, brown-necked parrots, blue-bellied rollers and pygmy sunbirds; while in the northern winter Palearctic migrants such as ospreys and black-tailed godwits are found. The site has been designated an Important Bird Area (IBA) by BirdLife International because it supports significant populations of western reef egrets, black-winged stilts, slender-billed and grey-headed gulls, and Caspian and royal terns.

=== Human activities ===
The main human activities in and around the complex are shrimp fishing, market gardening and the cultivation of rice. During the dry season, a small number of women from the Jola forage for, roast and sell oysters which they harvest from the mangroves; the oysters are cooked with firewood collected at the same time.

== Climate change ==
Climate change and global warming pose a particular threat to wildlife in the wetlands as sea levels rise. In 2022, the IPCC Sixth Assessment Report included Tanbi Wetland Complex in the list of African natural heritage sites which would be threatened by flooding and coastal erosion by the end of the century, but only if climate change followed RCP 8.5, which is the scenario of high and continually increasing greenhouse gas emissions associated with the warming of over 4 °C., and is no longer considered very likely. The other, more plausible scenarios result in lower warming levels and consequently lower sea level rise: yet, sea levels would continue to increase for about 10,000 years under all of them. Even if the warming is limited to 1.5 °C, global sea level rise is still expected to exceed 2–3 m (7–10 ft) after 2000 years (and higher warming levels will see larger increases by then), consequently exceeding 2100 levels of sea level rise under RCP 8.5 (~0.75 m (2 ft) with a range of 0.5–1 m (2–3 ft)) well before the year 4000.
