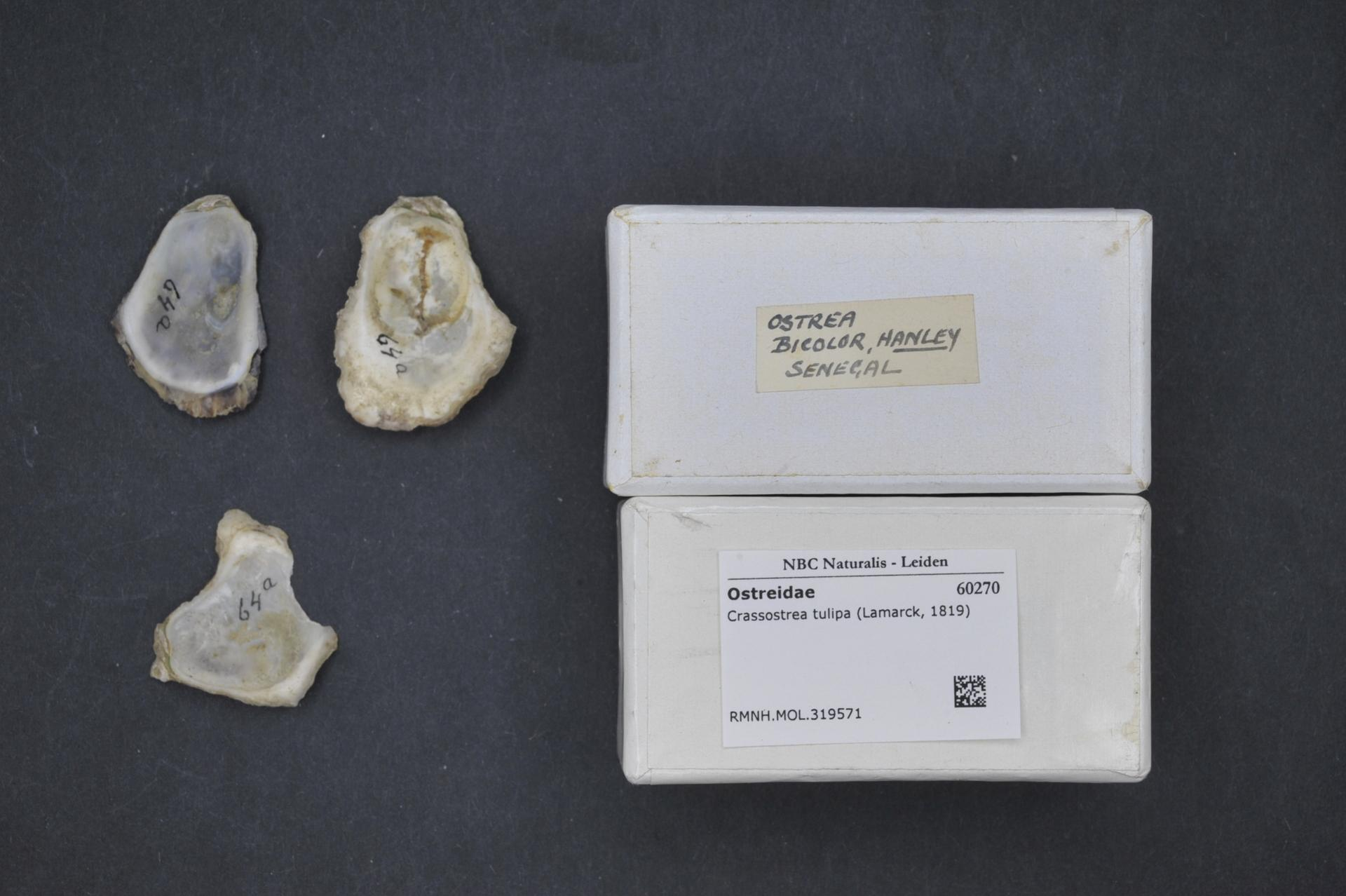

Conservation status
- Least Concern (IUCN 3.1)

Scientific classification
- Kingdom: Animalia
- Phylum: Mollusca
- Class: Bivalvia
- Order: Ostreida
- Family: Ostreidae
- Genus: Crassostrea
- Species: C. tulipa

Binomial name
- Crassostrea tulipa Lamarck, 1819

Synonyms
- Crassostrea gasar; Gryphaea gasar; Ostrea adansoni; Ostrea bicolor; Ostrea gallina; Ostrea gasar; Ostrea morenasi; Ostrea parasitica; Ostrea tulipa; Ostrea webbi

= Crassostrea tulipa =

Species of bivalve

Crassostrea tulipa, the West African mangrove oyster, is a true oyster in the family Ostreidae.

== Habitat/distribution ==
The mangrove oyster is found in tropical intertidal zones. It grows on the bark of the stilt sections of mangrove trees, which are exposed during low tides and covered during high tides. It can also be found on some other suitable intertidal substrates in its range. This oyster has evolved to survive exposed to the air during low tides. The mangrove oyster is found on West African shorelines.
