= Kiang West National Park =

National park in the Gambia

- IUCN category II (national park)
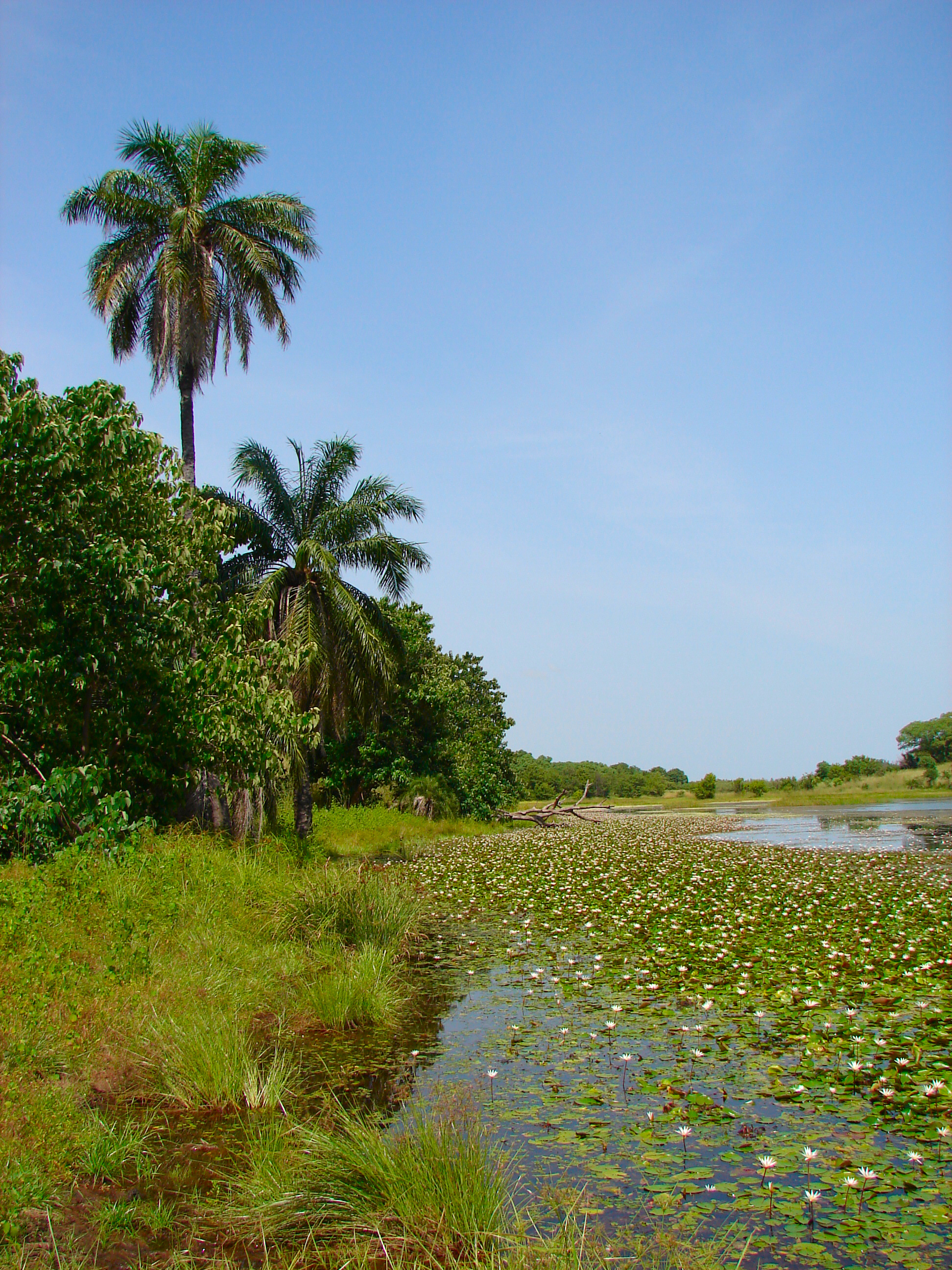
- Typical scenery of Kiang West

- Location within The Gambia
- Location: Gambia
- Coordinates: 13°23′N 15°55′W
- Area: 115 square kilometres (28,417 acres)
- Established: 1987
- Governing body: The Gambia Department of Parks and Wildlife Management

Kiang West National Park is one of the largest and most important wildlife reserves in the Gambia. It was declared a national park in 1987 and is managed by the Gambia Department of Parks and Wildlife Management.

== Geography ==
The park covers an area of 11,526 hectares, and is located on the south bank of the Gambia River, in the Lower River Division in the Kiang West District. The park's headquarters is situated in Dumbuto Village which is 18 minutes drive away from Tendaba village, 145 kilometres (90 mi) from the Gambian capital city Banjul, and 100 kilometres (62 mi) from the Gambian coastline. The Gambia River marks the park's northern boundary. Three bolons (creeks)—the Jarin, Jali, and Nganingkoi—divide the park's interior into three sections. The park is unpopulated, with villages located close outside its borders.

Most of the park is located on a plateau of low altitude, and is mostly Guinea savanna and dry deciduous woodland, and it also has tidal flats and mangrove creeks.

=== Flora ===
Vegetation types in the park include Guinean savanna and dry deciduous woodland. The park's tree species include the baobab (Adansonia digitata), red acacia (Acacia seyal), Pterocarpus erinaceus, Ceiba pentandra, Terminalia macroptera, Prosopis africana, and Ficus species. Grasses in the park include Andropogon.

=== Fauna ===
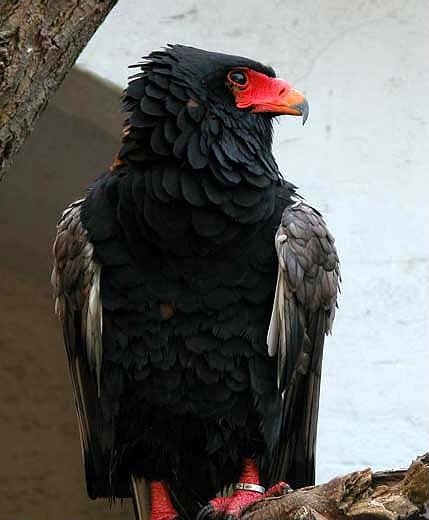
The bateleur can be seen in the park

The park is an important area for Gambian wildlife, as individuals of most of its remaining mammal species are found within it. These mammals include the African clawless otter, bushbuck, caracal, common duiker, leopard, marsh mongoose, serval, sitatunga, spotted hyena, warthog and West African manatee. West African manatees and humpback dolphins are sometimes observed in the Jarin bolon.

The park's reptile species include the African python, Bell’s hinged tortoise, West African crocodile, Nile monitor, puff adder, royal python and spitting cobra.

The park has more than 300 bird species, more than half of all the bird species that have been recorded in the Gambia. It has been designated an Important Bird Area (IBA) by BirdLife International. Some of the park's bird species have a very local distribution and are rarely observed in other locations in the Gambia. There are 21 birds of prey, including eagle, falcon, harrier, hawk, and vulture species. There are quite a large number of birds of prey in the park during the dry season. Other bird species in the park include ten kingfisher species, ground-hornbills and the threatened brown-necked parrot, which breeds in the park's mangroves. Other bird species include white-fronted black chat, Dorst's cisticola, Burchell's courser, brown-rumped bunting and chestnut-crowned sparrow-weaver, which have restricted distributions in the Gambia. The bateleur, a short tailed eagle species, is the park's official symbol. The bateleur hunts for sandgrouse and pigeons in the park, and is most often seen there from July to September.

=== Conservation ===
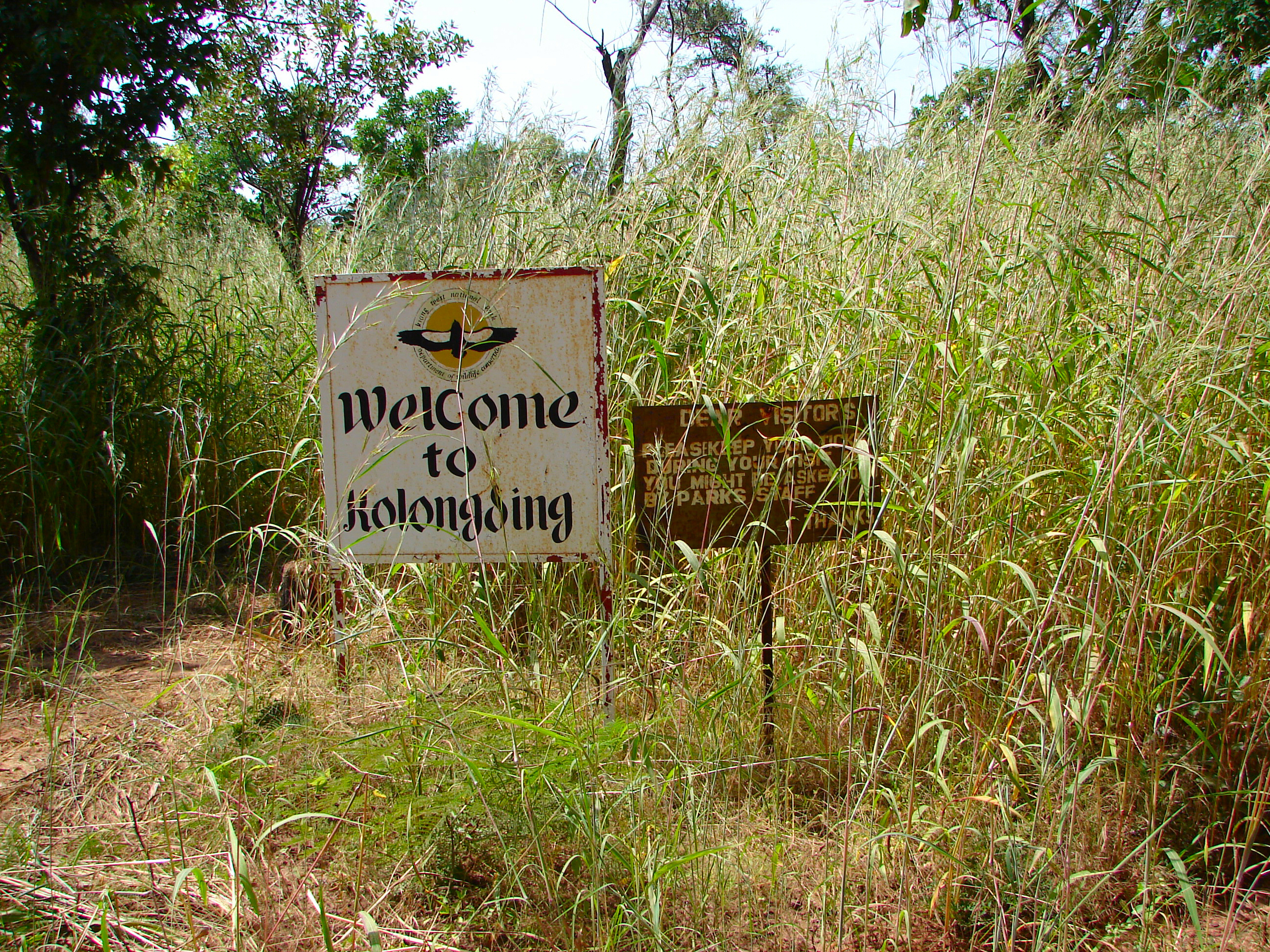
Park entrance

Local people are permitted to gather a small amount of firewood and forest products, and to cultivate some rice within the park boundaries. Annual forest fires badly affect the park. In 2001, a large fire burned through the length of the park for two days.

== Access ==
The park receives few tourists. November to January are the best months to visit. The park's headquarters and tourist bungalows are located at Dumbutu. Tendaba Camp in Tendaba village has been open since the 1970s and is the most established base for trips to the national park. Chalets in this camp provide accommodation for tourists. The park's road system is underdeveloped. Tubabkollon Point, located near a sandy beach beside the Gambia River in the northeast of the park, is a good place for visitors to watch wildlife. The park is becoming well known as a good place for birdwatching.
