= Vero cell =

Cell lineage used in cell cultures

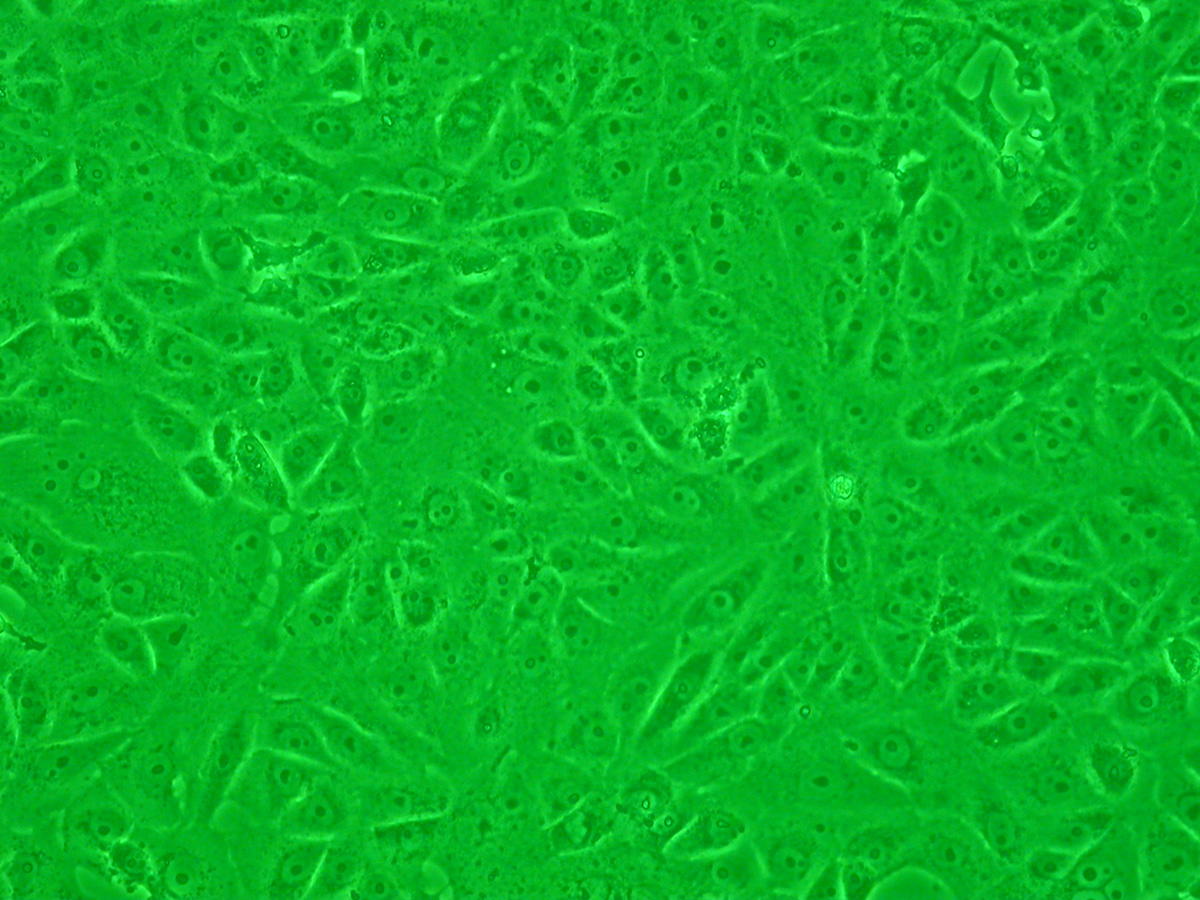
Phase-contrast microscopic image of Vero cells (under green light at 100-fold magnification)

Vero cells are a lineage of cells used in cell cultures. The 'Vero' lineage was isolated from kidney epithelial cells extracted from an African green monkey (Chlorocebus sp.; formerly called Cercopithecus aethiops, this group of monkeys has been split into several different species). The lineage was developed on 27 March 1962 by Yasumura and Kawakita at the Chiba University in Chiba, Japan. The original cell line was named Vero after an abbreviation of verda reno, which means 'green kidney' in Esperanto, while vero itself means 'truth' in Esperanto.

== Characteristics ==
The Vero cell lineage is continuous and aneuploid, meaning that it has an abnormal number of chromosomes. A continuous cell lineage can be replicated through many cycles of division and not become senescent. Vero cells are interferon-deficient; unlike normal mammalian cells, they do not secrete interferon alpha or beta when infected by viruses. However, they still have the Interferon-alpha/beta receptor, so they respond normally when recombinant interferon is added to their culture media.

The whole genome sequence of a Vero cell line was determined by Japanese investigators in 2014. Chromosome 12 of Vero cells has a homozygous ~9-Mb deletion, causing the loss of the type I interferon gene cluster and cyclin-dependent kinase inhibitors CDKN2A and CDKN2B in the genome. Although African green monkeys were previously classified as Cercopithecus aethiops, they have been placed within the genus Chlorocebus, which includes several species. The genome analysis indicated that the Vero cell lineage is derived from a female Chlorocebus sabaeus.

== Uses in research ==
Vero cells are used for many purposes, including:

- screening for the toxin of Escherichia coli, first named "Vero toxin" after this cell line, and later called "Shiga-like toxin" due to its similarity to Shiga toxin isolated from Shigella dysenteriae
- as host cells for growing viruses; for example, to measure replication in the presence or absence of a research pharmaceutical, the testing for the presence of rabies virus, or the growth of viral stocks for research purposes. As a recent example, CoronaVac, COVID-19 vaccine developed by Sinovac Biotech uses vero cells in production and "Vero" term can be seen on the vaccine container.
- as host cells for eukaryotic parasites, specially of the trypanosomatids

== Lineages ==
- Vero (ATCC No. CCL-81)

Isolated from C. aethiops kidney on 27 Mar 1962

- Vero 76 (ATCC No. CRL-1587)

Isolated from Vero in 1968, it grows to a lower saturation density (cells per unit area) than the original Vero. It is useful for detecting and counting hemorrhagic fever viruses by plaque assays.

- Vero E6, also known as Vero C1008 (ATCC No. CRL-1586)

This line is a clone from Vero 76. Vero E6 cells show some contact inhibition, so are suitable for propagating viruses that replicate slowly.

- Research strains transfected with viral genes:

Vero F6 is a cell transfected with the gene encoding HHV-1 entry protein glycoprotein-H (gH). Vero F6 was transfected via a concatenated plasmid with the gH gene after a copy of the HHV-1 glycoprotein-D (gD) promoter region. In Vero lineage F6, expression of gH is under the control of the promoter region of gD. (Also F6B2; obs. F6B1.1)

== See also ==
- HeLa cells
- Immortalised cell line
