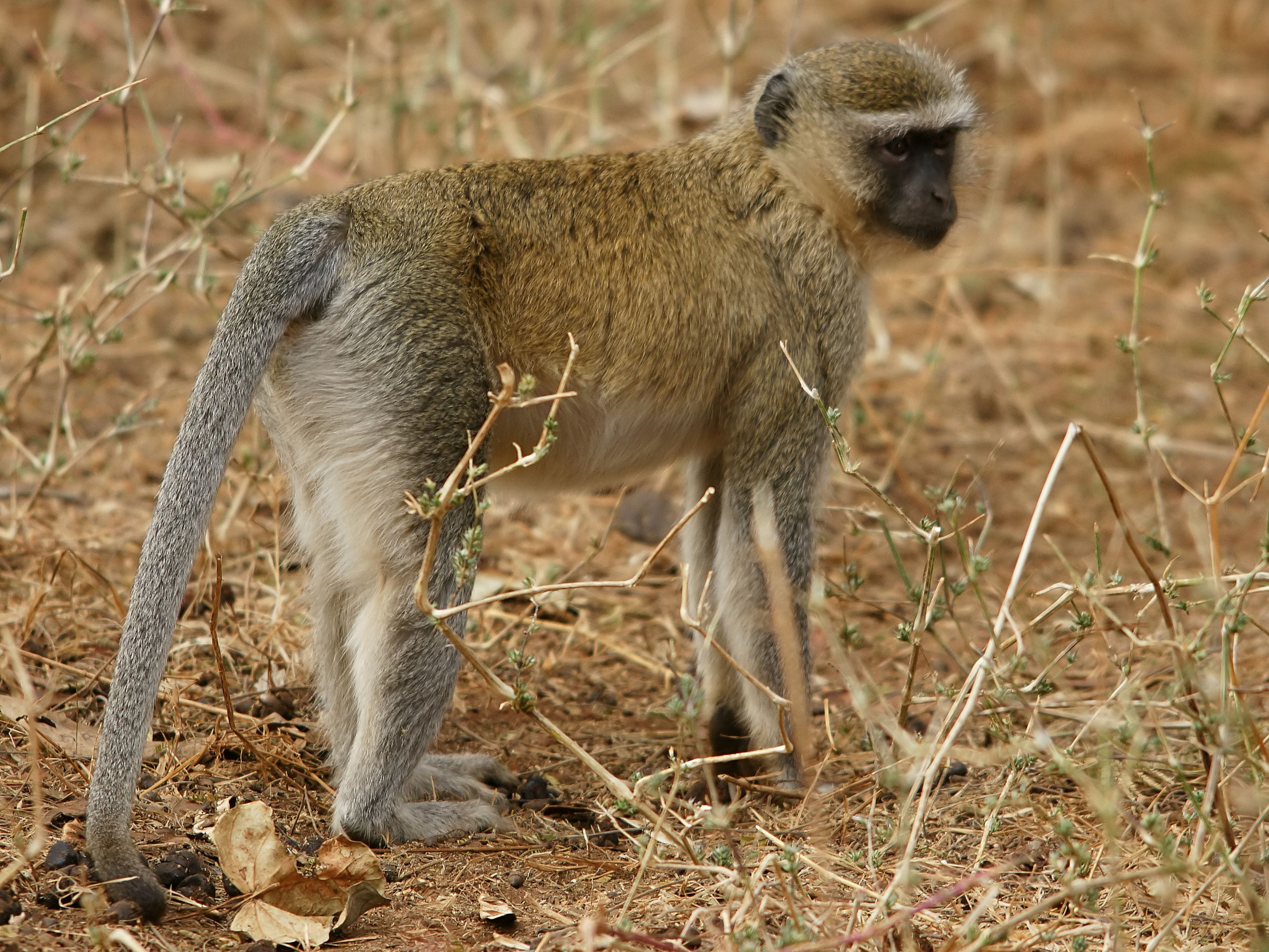

Conservation status
- Least Concern (IUCN 3.1)

Scientific classification
- Kingdom: Animalia
- Phylum: Chordata
- Class: Mammalia
- Order: Primates
- Family: Cercopithecidae
- Genus: Chlorocebus
- Species: C. cynosuros

Binomial name
- Chlorocebus cynosuros (Scopoli, 1786)
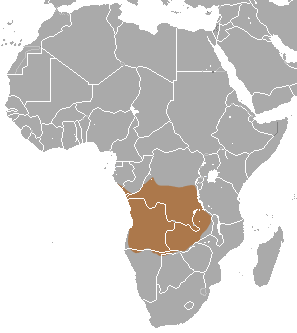
- Malbrouck range

= Malbrouck =

Species of Old World monkey

The malbrouck (Chlorocebus cynosuros) is an Old World primate from Africa that belongs to the genus Chlorocebus. The species is sometimes classified as a subspecies of the vervet monkey (C. pygerythrus), or of the widespread grivet (C. aethiops).

== Physical characteristics ==
The malbrouck is a slim, agile primate with long limbs and a long tail. The fur is olive-grey. The breast and underparts are white, as well as the cheeks and eyebrows, which surround the bald, pale-blotched face. The eyes are brown. The genitals are brightly colored; the scrotum of the male is blue, the penis is red. Males are about 20% larger than females.

== Distribution and habitat ==
The malbrouck is found in central and south-central Africa, ranging from the Albertine Rift in DR Congo west to the Atlantic coast and south to northern Namibia and Zambia west of the Luangwa River. It lives in marshy forest, savanna-forest and montane forest up to an altitude of 4,500 m (14,750 ft).

== Behaviour ==
The malbrouck is a diurnal animal living in large groups, consisting of six to more than 50 animals. The number of males and females is usually about the same. Each group has its own territory, the size of which depends on the amount of available food. The malbrouck uses a wide range of sounds and gestures to communicate with other members of a group.

=== Diet ===
The diet of this omnivorous species consists of fruit, seeds, flowers, gum, invertebrates, eggs, chicks and lizards. Vegetable food forms the largest part of the diet in most areas.
