= Mir-3180 microRNA precursor family =

mir-3180
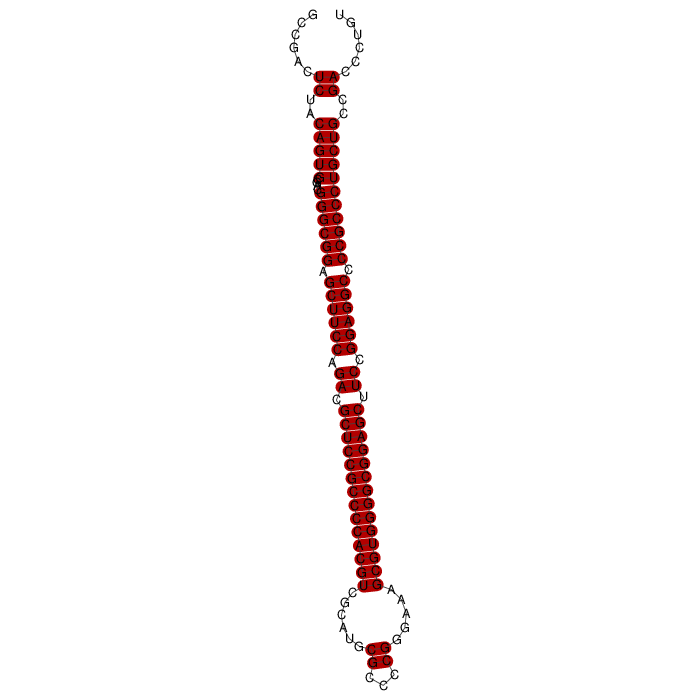
- Conserved secondary structure of the mir-3180 miRNA.

Identifiers
- Symbol: mir-3180
- Rfam: RF02010
- miRBase family: MIPF0000894
- HGNC: 38382

Other data
- RNA type: microRNA
- Domain(s): Eukaryota; Metazoa
- PDB structures: PDBe

In molecular biology mir-3180 microRNA is a short RNA molecule. MicroRNAs function to regulate the expression levels of other genes by several mechanisms. The mir-10 microRNA precursor is a short non-coding RNA gene that is part of an RNA gene family which contains mir-3180-1, mir-3180-2, mir-3180-3, mir-3180-4 and mir-3180-5. They have now been predicted or experimentally confirmed in a wide range of cancers in humans. (MIPF0000894, mir-3180) mir-3180 has currently only been identified in human Homo sapiens.

== Species distribution ==
The presence of mir-3180 has been detected in a range of catarrhine monkeys. It has been identified in primates including human (Homo sapiens), Sumatran orangutan (Pongo abelii), western lowland gorilla (Gorilla gorilla gorilla), Northern white-cheeked gibbon (Nomascus leucogenys), Chlorocebus sabaeus (Chlorocebus sabaeus), Olive baboon (Papio anubis) and Rhesus monkey (Macaca mulatta). In some of these species the presence of mir-3180 has been shown experimentally, in others the genes encoding mir-3180 might have been predicted computationally.

== Genomic location ==
The mir-3180 genes are found within the Chromosome 16. In humans there are five mir-3180 clusters, these contain five genes encoding miRNAs (mir-3180-1, mir-3180-2, mir-3180-3, mir-3180-4 and mir-3180-5). The mir-3180 genes have the following locations:

hsa-mir-3180-1 chr16 Start: 14911220 End: 14911313 Strand: +

hsa-mir-3180-2 chr16 Start: 16309879 End: 16309966 Strand: +

hsa-mir-3180-3 chr16 Start: 18402178 End: 18402271 Strand: -

hsa-mir-3180-4 chr16 Start: 15154850 End: 15155002 Strand: -

hsa-mir-3180-5 chr16 Start: 2135977 End: 2136129 Strand: -

== Association with cancer ==
Recently there has been much interest in abnormal levels of expression of microRNAs in cancers. Upregulation of mir-3180 has been found in cancers. Increased levels of mir-3180 have been found in colon cancer.

== See also ==
- MicroRNA
