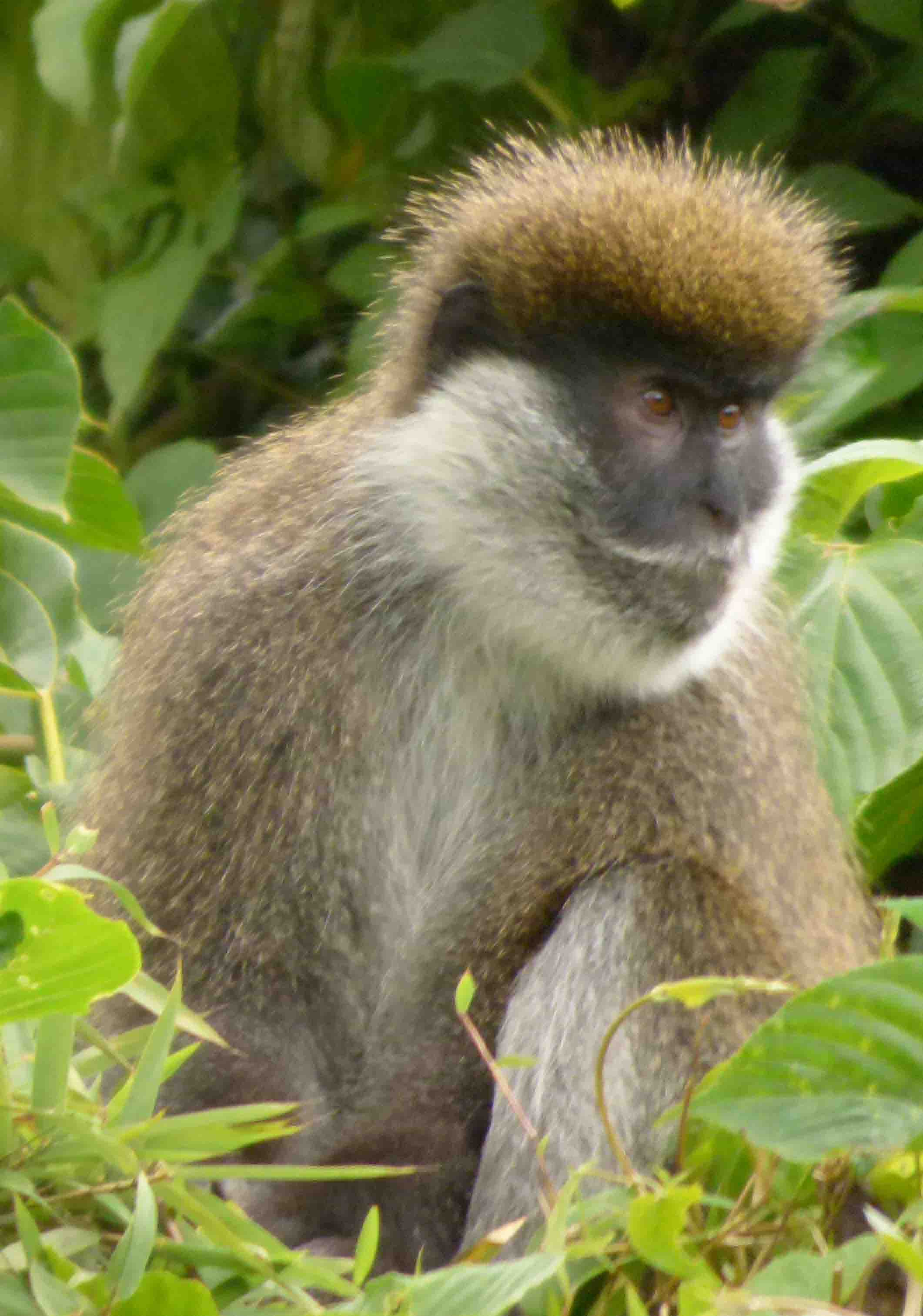
- A Bale Mountains vervet, near Rira, Ethiopia

Conservation status
- Vulnerable (IUCN 3.1)

Scientific classification
- Kingdom: Animalia
- Phylum: Chordata
- Class: Mammalia
- Order: Primates
- Family: Cercopithecidae
- Genus: Chlorocebus
- Species: C. djamdjamensis

Binomial name
- Chlorocebus djamdjamensis (Neumann, 1902)
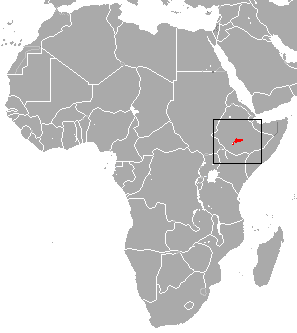
- Bale Mountains vervet range

Synonyms
- Cercopithecus djamdjamensis (Neumann, 1902)

= Bale Mountains vervet =

Species of Old World monkey

The Bale Mountains vervet (Chlorocebus djamdjamensis) is a terrestrial Old World monkey endemic to Ethiopia, found in the bamboo forests of the Bale Mountains. All species in Chlorocebus were formerly in the genus Cercopithecus. The Bale Mountains vervet is one of the least-known primates in Africa. They avoid tree-dominated and bushland areas as their habitat. These monkeys mainly reside in the bamboo forest (Odubullu Forest) of the Bale Mountains due their dietary specialization on bamboo, but other factors, such as climate, forest history, soil quality, and disease, are likely to play a role in their choice to inhabit this area. The Bale Mountains vervet have a very quiet behavior and tend to flee when encountering a human being. It is also known as the Bale monkey and Bale Mountain grivet.

== Taxonomy ==
The Bale monkey is a member of genus Chlorocebus, along with six sister species. All members of Chlorocebus were formerly considered to be part of Cercopithecus; the Bale monkey was formerly known as Cercopithecus djamdjamensis. It was originally described as a subspecies of the grivet (Chlorocebus aethiops).

A 2018 study found that the populations of Bale monkey living in fragmented forests were genetically distinct from populations in continuous forests. This is due to the fragmented forest populations' hybridization with the grivet (Chlorocebus aethiops) and the vervet monkey (Chlorocebus pygerythrus). The Bale monkey does not currently co-occur with either of these monkeys in the wild and so it is proposed that this hybridization occurred over a century ago.

== Ecology ==
The Bale Mountains vervet monkey is a dietary specialist with African alpine bamboo (Yushania alpina) making up as much as 77% of its diet. This makes the species unique in the genus Chlorocebus as the other five species are dietary generalist species. The diets of Bale monkeys in continuous forests are made up of approximately 10 species of plants; however, populations in fragmented forests have considerably higher dietary diversity and consume up to five times more species. For those populations, bamboo makes up as little as 2% of their diet. It is unclear if this dietary flexibility is due to hybridization from grivet and vervet monkeys or if the species adapts in the absence of bamboo. This dietary flexibility makes the Bale monkey less dependent on its main food source than other dietary specialist species like the koala or giant panda. In areas where Bale monkeys and human settlements co-occur, the monkeys often raid crops for food which can spark retaliatory hunting.

== Conservation status ==
The Bale monkey is currently rated vulnerable by the IUCN Red List and is listed on Appendix II of CITES. The main threats to the species are habitat loss and hunting. They could be threatened by hybridization with the grivet and the vervet monkey in the future.

The monkey feeds on bamboo and may thus be threatened by deforestation. Encroaching human populations have nearly extirpated the Bale monkey from the Sidamo Highlands. The monkey is persecuted for crop raiding and hunted by local people. It is protected in parts of its range by the Bale Mountains National Park; the proposed Harena-Kokosa National Forest Reserve would protect some populations.
