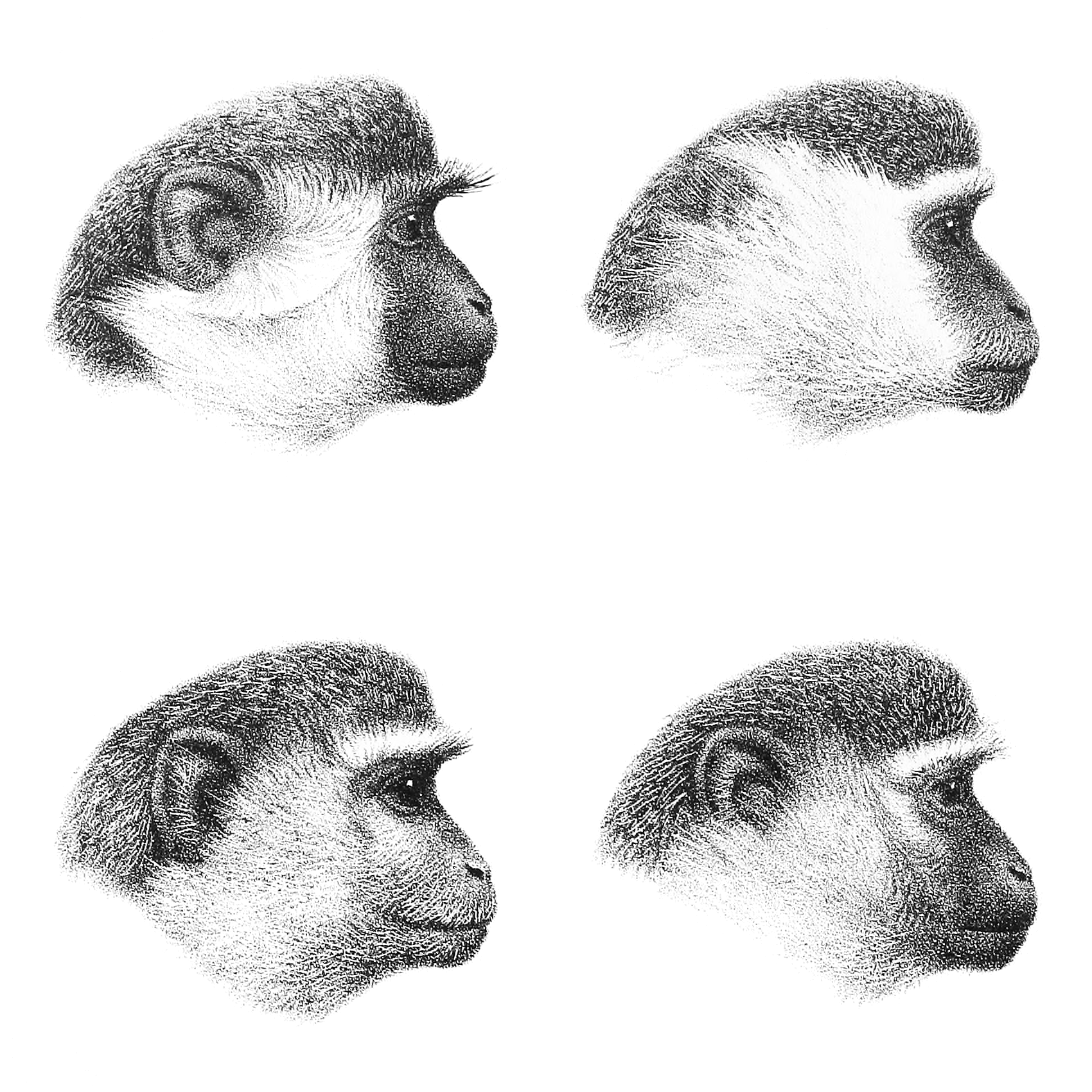
- Chlorocebus head color patterns Top left: green monkey, top right: grivet Bottom left: malbrouck, bottom right: vervet

Scientific classification
- Kingdom: Animalia
- Phylum: Chordata
- Class: Mammalia
- Order: Primates
- Family: Cercopithecidae
- Subfamily: Cercopithecinae
- Tribe: Cercopithecini
- Genus: Chlorocebus; J.E. Gray, 1870

Type species
- Simia aethiops Linnaeus, 1766

Species
- Chlorocebus aethiops; Chlorocebus cynosuros; Chlorocebus djamdjamensis; Chlorocebus dryas; Chlorocebus pygerythrus; Chlorocebus sabaeus; Chlorocebus tantalus

= Chlorocebus =

Genus of Old World monkeys

Chlorocebus is a genus of medium-sized primates from the family of Old World monkeys. Seven species are currently recognized. They make up the entirety of the genus Chlorocebus.

Confusingly, the terms "vervet monkey" and "green monkey" are sometimes used to refer to the whole genus Chlorocebus, though they also refer more precisely to species Chlorocebus pygerythrus and Chlorocebus sabaeus, respectively, neither of which is the type species for Chlorocebus. This article uses the term Chlorocebus consistently for the genus and the common names only for the species.

The native range of these monkeys is sub-Saharan Africa from Senegal and Ethiopia south to South Africa. However, in previous centuries, a number of them were taken as pets by early Caribbean settlers and slave traders, and were transported across the Atlantic Ocean to the Caribbean islands. The monkeys subsequently escaped or were released and became naturalized. Today, they are found on the West Indian islands of Barbados, Saint Kitts, Nevis, Anguilla, and Saint Martin. A colony also exists in Broward County, Florida.

== Taxonomy ==
They were previously lumped together with the medium-sized arboreal African monkeys of the guenon genus, Cercopithecus, where they were classified as a single species, Cercopithecus aethiops. More species and subspecies are expected to be identified as scientists study this genus further.

Genus Chlorocebus – Gray, 1870 – seven species
Common name	Scientific name and subspecies	Range	Size and ecology	IUCN status and estimated population
Bale Mountains vervet	C. djamdjamensis (Neumann, 1902) Two subspecies: C. d. djamdjamensis; C. d. harennaensis	Eastern Africa	Size: 43–45 cm (17–18 in) long, plus 47–50 cm (19–20 in) tail Habitat: Forest Diet: Leaves and fruit, as well as flowers, small vertebrates, shoots, stems, and roots	VU Unknown
Dryas monkey	C. dryas (Schwarz, 1932)	Central Africa	Size: 36–40 cm (14–16 in) long, plus 48–52 cm (19–20 in) tail Habitat: Forest Diet: Fruit, leaves, shoots, pith, seeds, insects, and mushrooms	EN 100–250
Green monkey	C. sabaeus (Linnaeus, 1766)	Western Africa	Size: 42–46 cm (17–18 in) long, plus 42–72 cm (17–28 in) tail Habitat: Forest and savanna Diet: Fruit and leaves	LC Unknown
Grivet	C. aethiops (Linnaeus, 1758) Two subspecies: C. a. aethiops; C. a. matschiei	Eastern Africa	Size: 40–60 cm (16–24 in) long, plus 30–50 cm (12–20 in) tail Habitat: Savanna and shrubland Diet: Fruit, insects, and vegetable matter, as well as small mammals and birds	LC Unknown
Malbrouck	C. cynosuros (Scopoli, 1786)	Southern Africa	Size: 34–70 cm (13–28 in) long, plus 44–79 cm (17–31 in) tail Habitat: Forest and savanna Diet: Fruit, as well as shoots, stems, gum, and seeds	LC Unknown
Tantalus monkey	C. tantalus (Ogilby, 1841) Three subspecies: C. t. budgetti; C. t. marrensis; C. t. tantalus	Equatorial Africa	Size: 38–83 cm (15–33 in) long, plus 55–114 cm (22–45 in) tail Habitat: Forest and savanna Diet: Fruit, buds, seeds, roots, bark, and gum, as well as insects, small vertebrates and eggs	LC Unknown
Vervet monkey	C. pygerythrus (F. Cuvier, 1821) Five subspecies: C. p. hilgerti; C. p. nesiotes; C. p. pygerythrus; C. p. rufoviridis; C. p. zavattarii	Eastern and southern Africa	Size: 42–57 cm (17–22 in) long, plus 48–75 cm (19–30 in) tail Habitat: Savanna, shrubland, and forest Diet: Leaves, flowers, fruit, seeds, arthropods, and gum	LC Unknown

The most basal member of the genus is thought to be the dryas monkey (C. dryas), which was previously classified in Cercopithecus and may potentially warrant its own genus.

== Physical description ==
The dorsal fur of Chlorocebus monkeys varies by species from pale yellow through grey-green brown to dark brown, while the lower portion and the hair ring around the face is a whitish yellow. The face, hands, and feet are hairless and black, although their abdominal skin is bluish. Males have a blue scrotum and red penis. The monkeys are sexually dimorphic, wild adult males range from 42 to 59 cm (17 to 23 in) and females are 30 to 49.5 cm (11.8 to 19.5 in), including a tail measuring 30 to 50 cm (12 to 20 in). Males weigh from 3.9 to 8 kg (8.6 to 17.6 lb) and females weigh from 3.4 to 5.3 kg (7.5 to 11.7 lb).

== Behavior and ecology ==
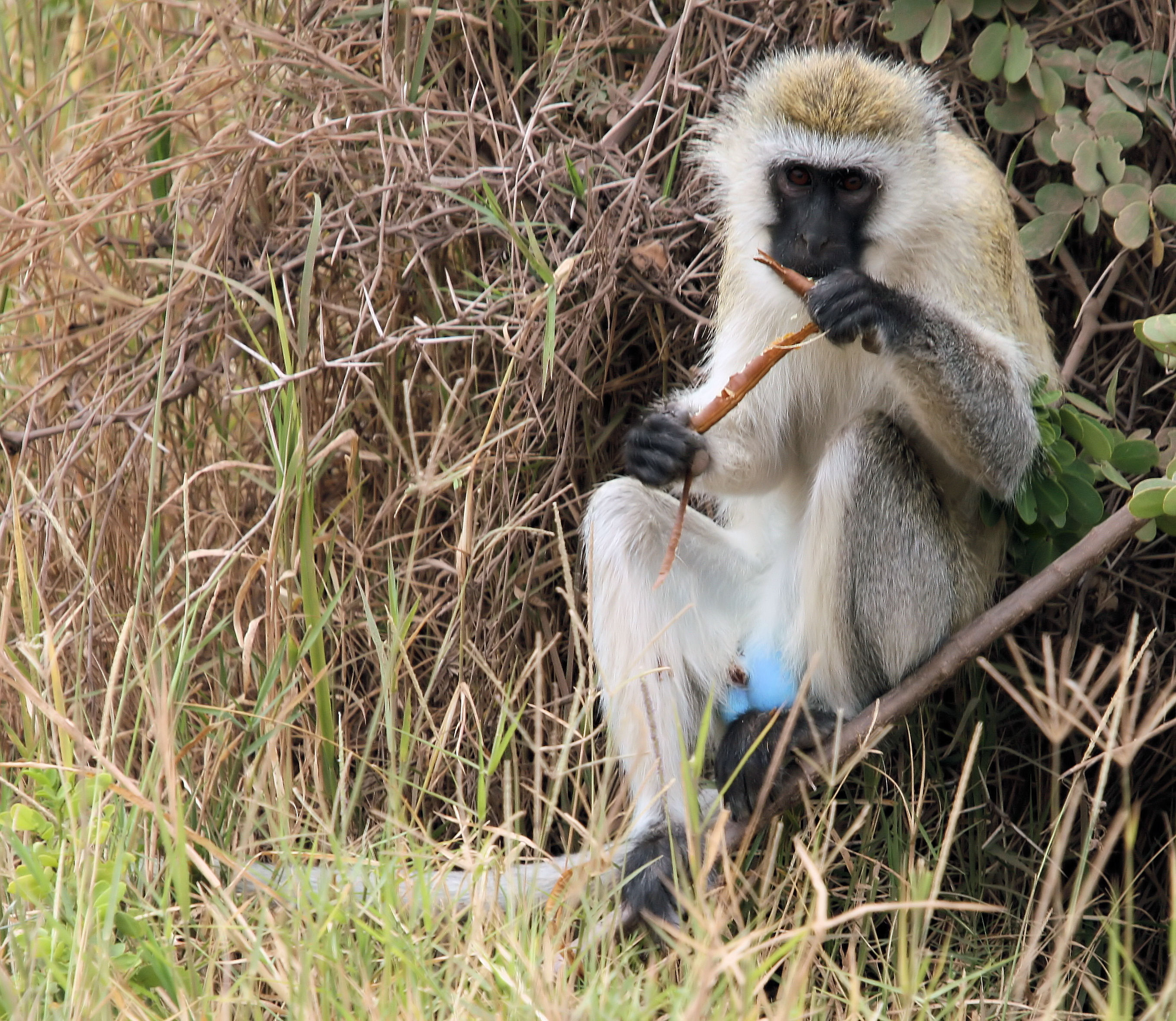
Male vervet monkey

Unlike the closely related guenons, Chlorocebus species are not primarily forest dwellers. Rather, they are semi-arboreal and semi-terrestrial, spending most of the day on the ground feeding and then sleeping at night in the trees. However, they must drink each day and are dependent on water, so they are never far from rivers or lakes. Like most other Old World monkeys, they have cheek pouches for storing food. They are diurnal, and are particularly active in the early morning and in the later afternoon or early evening.

Chlorocebus monkeys live in multiple male/multiple female groups, which can be as large as 76 individuals. The group hierarchy plays an important role: dominant males and females are given priority in the search for food, and are groomed by subordinate members of the group. They exhibit female philopatry, a social system whereby the females remain in the same home range where they were born, and males leave once sexually mature. These monkeys are territorial animals, and a group can occupy an area of approximately .06 to 1.78 km^{2} (0.023 to 0.687 mi^{2}). They use a wide variety of vocalizations. They can with warn off members of other groups from their territory, and they can also warn members of their own troop of dangers from predators, using different calls for different predators. Monkeys scream when they are disciplined by members of the troop. Facial expressions and body posturing serve as additional communication tools. Their social interactions are highly complex. Where alliances can be formed for benefit, deception is sometimes used. Physical affection is important between family members.

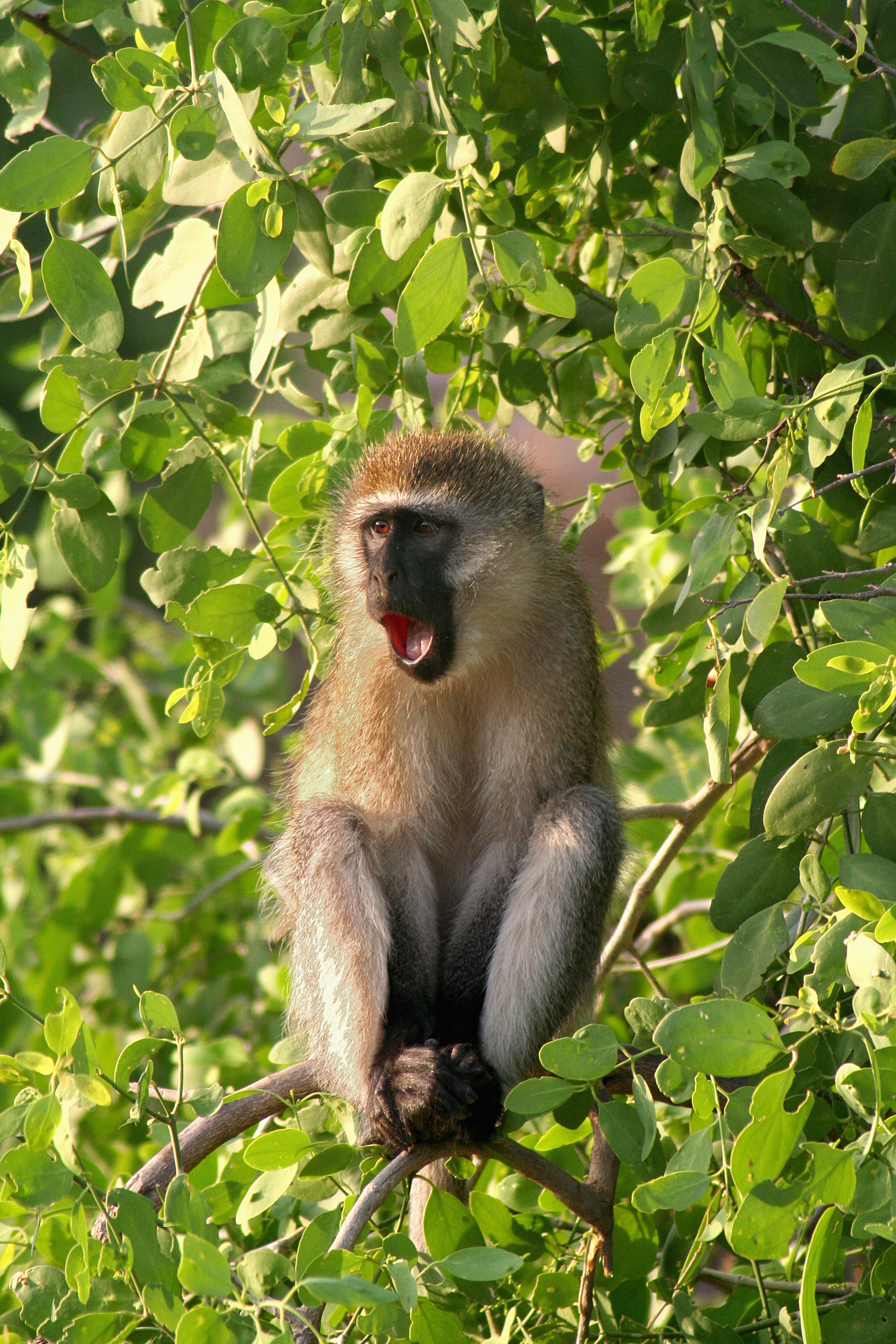
Yawning vervet monkey in Samburu National Reserve, Kenya

Chlorocebus monkeys are, along with chimpanzees and baboons, the most omnivorous of the primates. They will eat leaves, gum, seeds, nuts, grasses, fungi, fruit, berries, flowers, buds, shoots, invertebrates, bird eggs, birds, lizards, rodents, and other vertebrate prey. Their preferred foods are fruit and flowers, a seasonal resource, varied to cope with changes in food availability. On the island of Saint Kitts, they will commonly steal brightly coloured alcoholic drinks left behind by tourists on the beach. Many tourists have also found out these monkeys will deliver a powerful bite if they are cornered or threatened. In Africa, the documented attacks by these monkeys are extremely rare when compared with dog attacks, in spite of living very closely with humans and often being threatened by humans and their dogs.

To signal mating readiness, the female presents her vulva to the male. Since groups are made of several more females than males, each male mates with several females. Generally, the male will display a striking, light-blue scrotal pouch, most prevalent during the mating season. Males do not take part in raising the young, but other females of the group (the "aunties") share the burden. The dominance hierarchy also comes into play, as the offspring of the more dominant group members get preferential treatment. The gestation time is about 163–165 days, and births are typically of a single young. The births usually happen at the beginning of the rainy season, when sufficient food is available. The young are weaned at about six months of age and are fully mature in four to five years. The life expectancy of the green monkeys is 11–13 years in captivity, and about 10–12 years in the wild.

== Human interaction ==
In the Caribbean islands, interactions between humans and monkeys are sometimes problematic. On the island of Barbados, farmers complain about the monkeys damaging their crops, and many try to find ways to keep them at bay. On Halloween 2006, a monkey was suspected of causing an island-wide, eight-hour blackout. The monkey apparently climbed a light pole and tripped an 11,000- and 24,000-volt powerline.

In some African countries, many monkeys are killed by power lines, dogs, predatory animals e.g. wild cats, vehicles, shooting, poisoning, and hunting for sport. Added to this, an increase in desertification, and loss of habitat due to agriculture and urbanisation has occurred. As a result, the population numbers in troops are declining in urban areas to an average of between 15 and 25 individuals, with many troops disappearing altogether.

=== Use in scientific research and vaccine production ===
The African green monkey has been the focus of much scientific research since the 1950s, and cell lines derived from its tissues are still used today to produce vaccines for polio and smallpox. Chlorocebus species are also important in studying high blood pressure and AIDS. Unlike most other nonhuman primates, they naturally develop high blood pressure. In Africa, the monkeys are massively infected with simian immunodeficiency virus (SIV), related to the ancestor of human immunodeficiency virus (HIV), both of which are widespread throughout populations. Chlorocebus monkeys are a natural host of SIV and do not succumb to immunodeficiency upon infection; therefore they are an important model in AIDS studies to understand protective mechanisms against AIDS. The monkeys infected with SIV and humans infected with HIV differ in microbial responses to infection.

Vero cells are a continuous cell line derived from epithelial cells of the African green monkey kidney, and are widely used for research in immunology and infectious disease. Similar cell lines include buffalo green monkey kidney and BS-C-1.

Chlorocebus monkeys are an important model organism for studies of AIDS, microbiome, development, neurobehavior, neurodegeneration, metabolism and obesity. A genome of chlorocebus monkey (Chlorocebus sabaeus) was sequenced and the genome reference with gene models is available in genome browsers NCBI Chlorocebus_sabeus 1.1 and Ensembl Vervet-AGM (Chlorocebus sabaeus). It facilitated genomic investigations in this monkey, including population genetics studies across Africa and Caribbean and characterization of gene expression regulation across development in brain and peripheral tissues, during prenatal development, and during reaction to psychosocial stress related to relocation and social isolation.

Epigenetic clock based on CpG methylation in DNA - a complex biomarker of aging - was developed for Chlorocebus sabaeus in several variants: tissue-specific clocks for brain cortex, blood, and liver; multitissue clock; and human-sabaeus monkey clocks.

== Sources ==
- Kingdon, Jonathan (2014). Mammals of Africa. Vol. II: Primates. A & C Black. ISBN 978-1-4081-8991-7.
- Kingdon, Jonathan (2015). The Kingdon Field Guide to African Mammals (Second ed.). Bloomsbury Publishing. ISBN 978-1-4729-2531-2.
