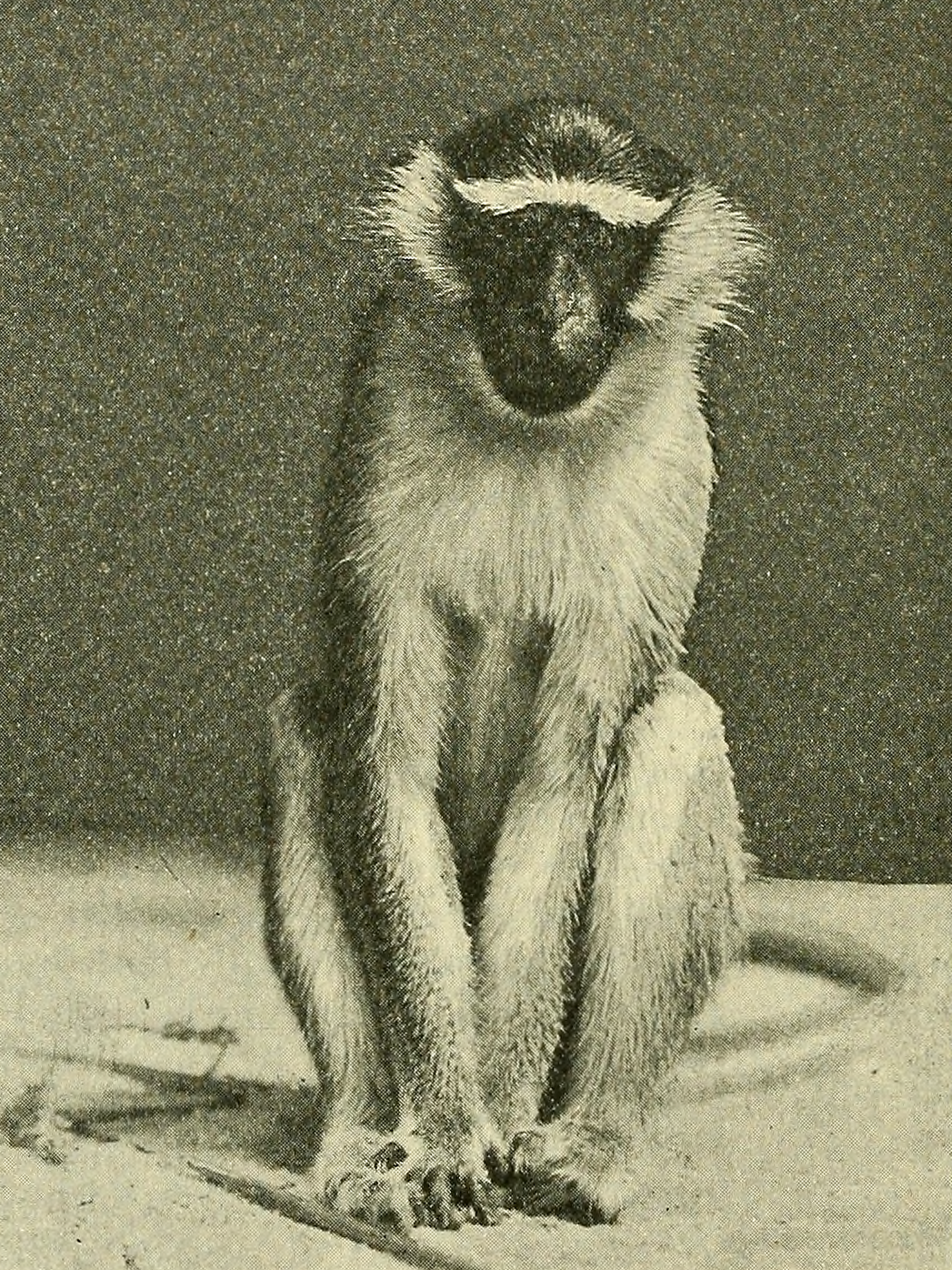

Conservation status
- Least Concern (IUCN 3.1)

Scientific classification
- Kingdom: Animalia
- Phylum: Chordata
- Class: Mammalia
- Order: Primates
- Suborder: Haplorhini
- Infraorder: Simiiformes
- Family: Cercopithecidae
- Genus: Chlorocebus
- Species: C. tantalus

Binomial name
- Chlorocebus tantalus (Ogilby, 1841)
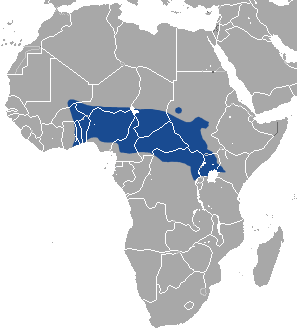
- Geographic range map

= Tantalus monkey =

Species of Old World monkey

The tantalus monkey (Chlorocebus tantalus) is an Old World monkey from Africa that ranges from Ghana to Sudan. It was originally described as a subspecies of the grivet (Chlorocebus aethiops). All species in Chlorocebus were formerly in the genus Cercopithecus. It is a common species with a wide range, and the International Union for Conservation of Nature has rated its conservation status as being of "least concern".

== Subspecies ==
This species has three recognized subspecies:

- C. t. tantalus
- C. t. budgetti
- C. t. marrensis

== Description ==
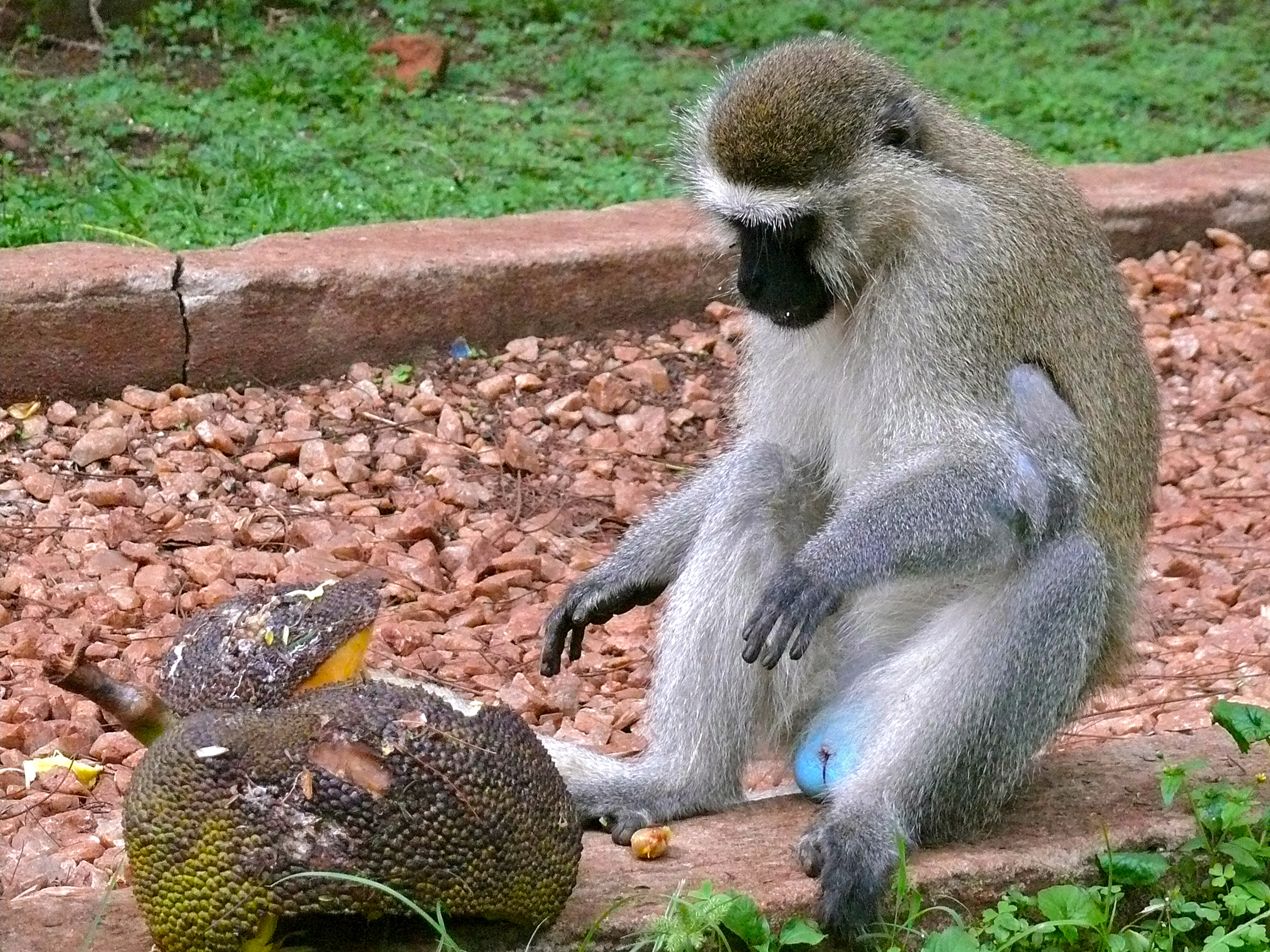
Male C. t. budgetti eating jackfruit

A medium-sized species, the tantalus monkey has a black face and a long tail. There is a distinctive undulating white or yellowish browband above the eyes. The cheeks and temples are white, the long hairs being swept backwards and often covering the ears in older individuals. The crown and dorsal surface of the body is grizzled and greenish or golden. The underparts are white and the tail and outer surfaces of the limbs grey. The tail may have a whitish tip. The male is larger than the female and has a bright blue scrotum surrounded by orange hairs.

== Distribution and habitat ==
This monkey is found in tropical central Africa. Its native range includes Benin, Burkina Faso, Cameroon, Central African Republic, Chad, Congo, Democratic Republic of Congo, Ghana, Kenya, Niger, Nigeria, South Sudan, Sudan, Togo and Uganda. It is an adaptable species able to inhabit open woodland, savannah, forest-grassland mosaic and riverside forest. It is at home in secondary forest and rural and urban locations.

== Ecology ==
Tantalus monkeys live in troops averaging about thirty individuals, with up to ten adult males and eighteen adult females, and varying numbers of juveniles and young. Some adult males move about singly. There is a social hierarchy within the group. These monkeys are demi-terrestrial and spend much of their time on the ground. The troop maintains a territory, defending it with vocalizations and threats, but some groups are less aggressive than others and share part of their territory with a neighbouring troop. Breeding takes place at different times of year in different parts of the range. A single offspring is the norm, with females giving birth for the first time when about five years old.
