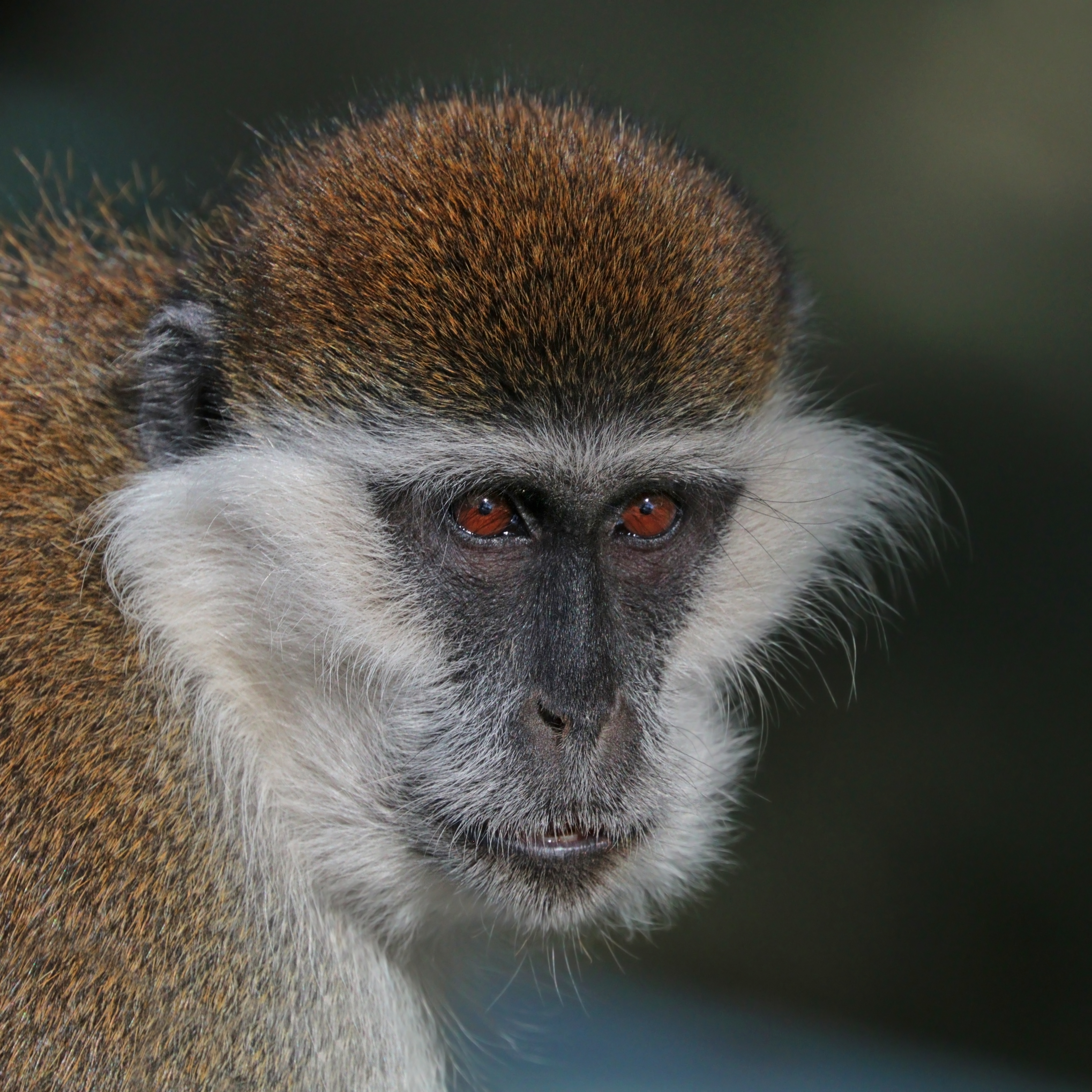
- Amora Gedel Park, Awasa, Ethiopia

Conservation status
- Least Concern (IUCN 3.1)

Scientific classification
- Kingdom: Animalia
- Phylum: Chordata
- Class: Mammalia
- Order: Primates
- Family: Cercopithecidae
- Genus: Chlorocebus
- Species: C. aethiops

Binomial name
- Chlorocebus aethiops (Linnaeus, 1758)
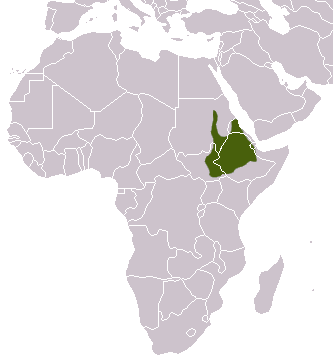
- Grivet range

= Grivet =

Species of Old World monkey

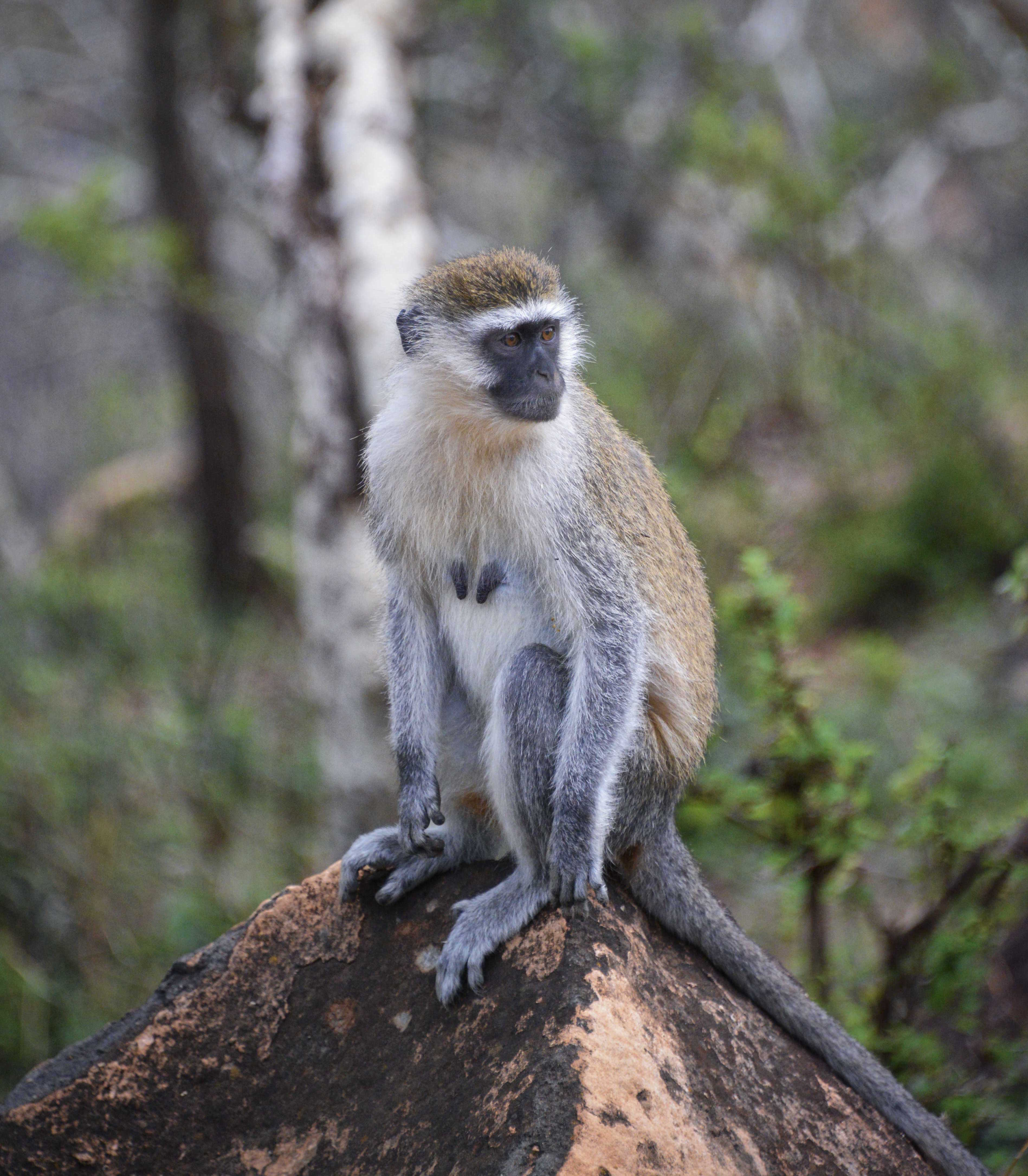
Female in Ethiopia

The grivet (Chlorocebus aethiops) is an Old World monkey with long white tufts of hair along the sides of its face. Some authorities consider this and all of the members of the genus Chlorocebus to be a single species, Cercopithecus aethiops. As here defined, the grivet is restricted to Ethiopia, Sudan, Djibouti, and Eritrea. In the southern part of its range, it comes into contact with the closely related vervet monkey (C. pygerythrus) and Bale Mountains vervet (C. djamdjamensis). Hybridization between them is possible, and may present a threat to the vulnerable Bale Mountains vervet. Unlike that species, the grivet is common and rated as least concern by the IUCN.

== Physical description ==
The grivet's facial skin, hands, and feet are black. The face has a white line above the eyes. It has long, white whiskers on the cheeks. The fur on the back has an olive color, while the front is white. The skin on the stomach has a blue tint. The fur has a bristly feel. The approximate head and body length for males is 49 cm (19 in) and 42.6 cm (16.8 in) for females. The length of the tail for males is about 30–50 cm (12–20 in). The body mass ranges from 3.4 to 8.0 kg (7.5 to 17.6 lb), with females at the smaller end of the scale.

== Habitat and distribution ==
The main habitat of the grivet is savanna woodlands. Its range is Sudan east of the White Nile, Eritrea, and Ethiopia east to the Rift Valley. It is also found in Djibouti. The grivet needs to live around a source of water, especially during the dry season. It is able to adapt to many environments.

== Local and indigenous names ==
In Tigrinya language: ወዓግ (wi'ag)

== Behavior ==
The grivet is most active in the morning and early evening. It stays on the ground most of the day to eat, and at night it sleeps in trees. The grivet spends a lot of time grooming, playing, climbing, and play fighting; all of these things help to ensure its survival. Its eating habits consist of eating mostly fruits, vegetables, and sometimes small mammals, insects, and birds, making it an omnivore. It also scavenges for human food. It must drink water daily, especially in the dry seasons. It is one of few species that has multiple-male groups that are of moderate size. In the hierarchy of males, an individual shows his dominance by putting his tail in a stiff, upright position and strolling past lower-ranked males. They travel in packs, and usually move on all fours or quadrupedally, except when using both hands for carrying, when they manage to walk and run quite comfortably on two legs. Groups can range from five to over 70.

Females will have a limited number of mates, while males may have several. Swelling of the female's vulva alerts males as to when she is in estrus. Giving birth to one baby at a time is common, and gestation usually lasts 2-3 months. When the baby is born, the mother cleans the infant and bites off the umbilical cord. Young have pink faces and black hair. Around two months are needed for them to get their adult coats. The first few months, the infant stays very close to its mother, but after 6 months, the infant is weaned.

== Conservation ==
Grivets are occasionally hunted as bushmeat. They are killed for either commercial or subsistence purposes. Although not endangered, they are threatened through destruction of habitat - forests. They are preyed on by large snakes, leopards, humans, and sometimes baboons. Grivets may live for 13 years.

== Relationship with humans ==
The grivet is one of five species of monkeys known to have been kept in ancient Egypt, the others being the hamadryas baboon, the olive baboon, the patas monkey, and the barbary macaque. Grivets were imported from the Land of Punt, as attested in paintings and in the Tale of the Shipwrecked Sailor. They were sometimes traded as far afield as Assyria. They are rarer in representations than baboons, and unlike baboons, do not seem to have borne individual names.

Grivets are depicted on Egyptian tombs as house pets and on leashes. In some depictions, they may symbolize male sexuality. Early Dynastic statuettes of grivets have been found in sanctuaries, where they may have been votive offerings to the baboon god. A grivet shooting a bow was an aspect of the invisible god Atum, and at Deltaic Babylon, a grivet was the town god represented by a statue in the temple.

Since the 1960s, the grivet has been harvested on an industrial scale by humans for their kidneys, which are used in poliovirus and adenovirus vaccine production. In 1967, the Marburg virus in grivets caused the death of 7 after 31 vaccine manufacturers fell ill. In the medical literature, the grivet and the green monkey are often confused. They are also used in medical research such as the testing of dengue vaccines as well as in the testing of human cosmetics.
