= List of schools in the Gambia =

This is a list of notable schools in the Gambia

== Schools (general) ==
- Dayspring Model Academy
- Muslim Senior Secondary School, Banjul
- Nusrat Senior Secondary School, Bundung
- Gambia Senior Secondary School, Banjul
- Marina International School, Bakau New Town
- École Française de Banjul, Bakau
- Banjul American Embassy School, Fajara
- St Peter's Senior Secondary School, Lamin
- St Augustin Senior Secondary School, Banjul
- The Swallow Centre of Emancipating Education
- British International School Gambia, Kotu
- Gambia Maarif School, Kotu
- SBEC International School, Sukuta and Bijilo
- Kotu Senior Secondary school, Kotu layout
- Ya Nana Academy, Nursery & Primary school, Bakau, near MRC
- Young Explorers Montessori Bilingual School, Brufut

== Central River ==
Schools in the Central River Division include:

- Armitage Senior Secondary School, Janjanbureh

== See also ==
- Education in the Gambia
- List of universities in the Gambia
