= List of buildings and structures in the Gambia =

A list of buildings and structures in the Gambia:

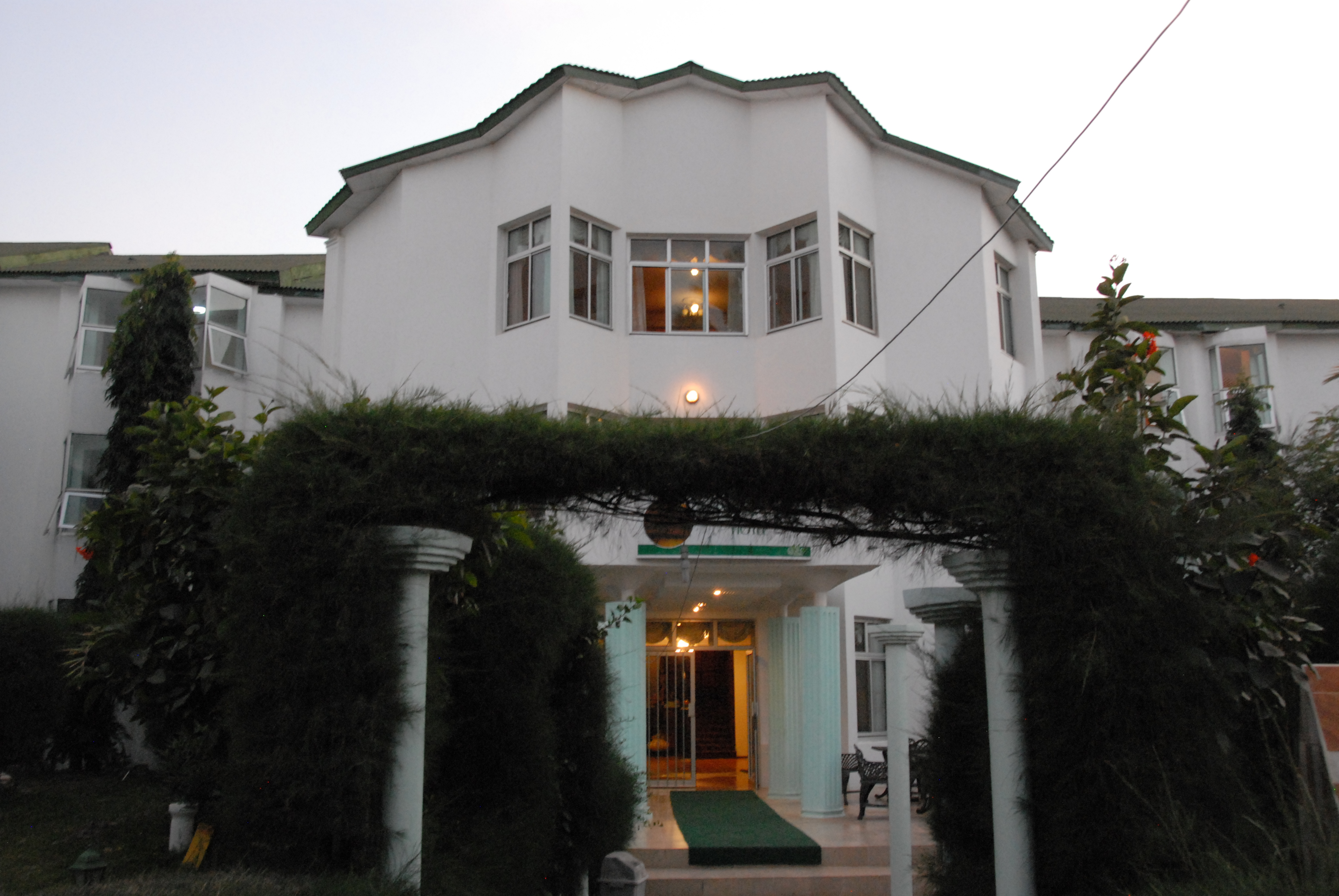
Paradise Suites Hotel, Banjul

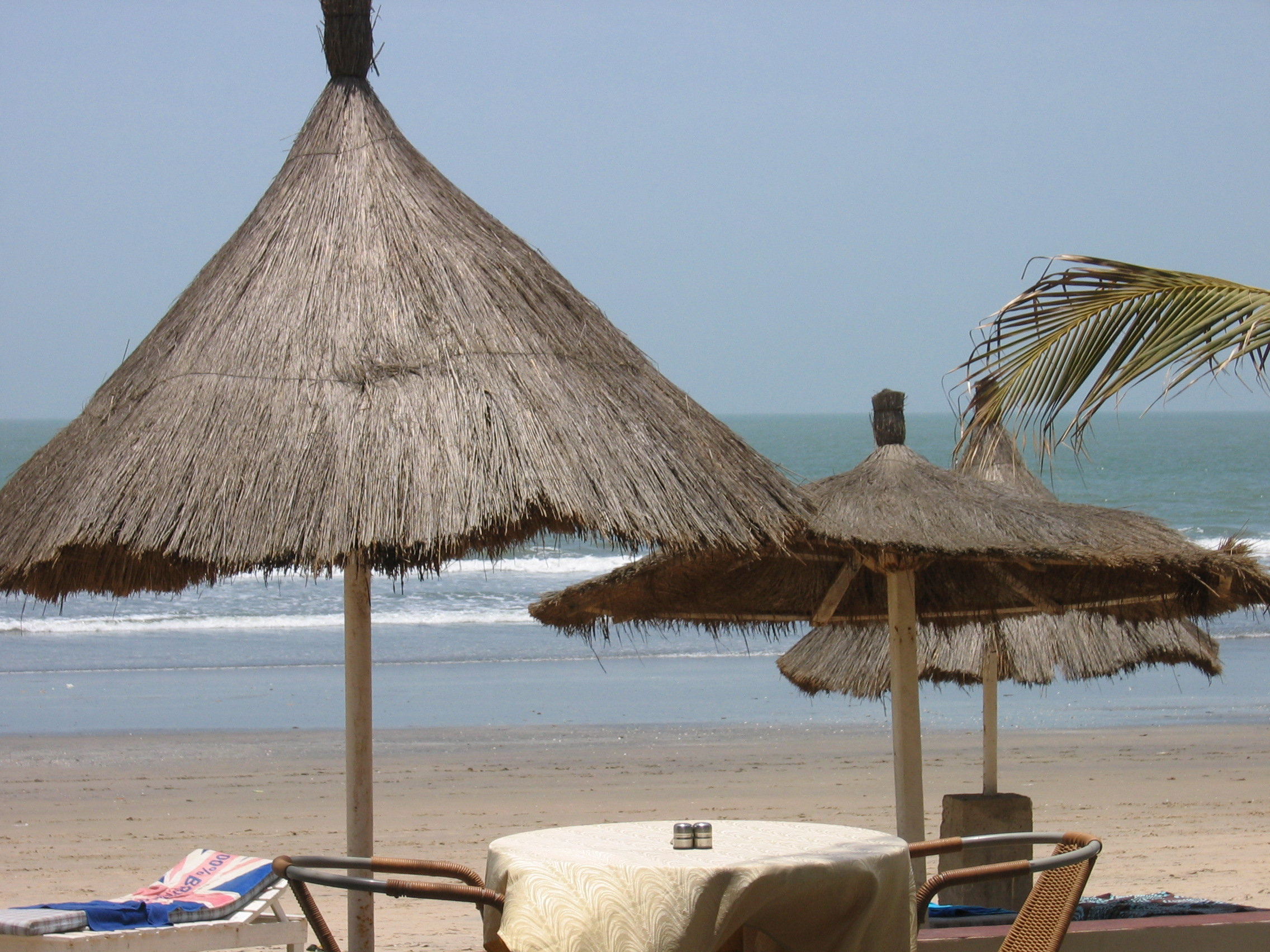
Kombo Beach Hotel, Kotu

== Banjul ==
- Banjul International Airport
- African Heritage Museum
- Albert Market
- Arch 22
- Gambia National Museum
- National Library of The Gambia
- Box Bar Stadium
- State House of the Gambia
- Royal Victoria Teaching Hospital

== Bakau ==
- Kachikally Museum and Crocodile Pool
- Independence Stadium

== Brufut ==
- Eden House
- Hibiscus House Gambia

== Janjanbureh ==
- Senegambian stone circles
