= Hassoum Ceesay =

Gambian historian

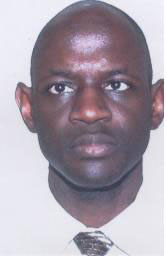
- Born: 1971 (age 54–55); Banjul, The Gambia
- Known for: Museum

Hassoum Ceesay (born 1971) is a Gambian historian, writer, and museum curator at the Gambia National Museum. He is one of the most prolific Gambian historians.

== Education ==
Hassoum Ceesay attended Armitage High School, and Fourah Bay College, University of Sierra Leone. He continued to Canada's Saint Mary's University, in the Nova Scotia capital of Halifax, where he gained a Bachelor of Arts in history in 1999. He gained a post-graduate Diploma in Museum Studies from the University of Nairobi, Kenya, in 2003.

== Career ==
Ceesay was the features editor at The Daily Observer newspaper in Banjul and editorial writer from 1999 to 2006. He was curator of The Gambia National Museum from 1999 to 2008, curating art and ethnography exhibitions. From January 2008 to August 2008 he was Deputy Permanent Secretary and Director of the Press Office for President Jammeh. In 2009 he gained a MA in African History from the University of the Gambia. In 2010 he was lead researcher on a UNESCO study of cultural rights in the Gambia.

He was Director of the Copyright Office. Ceesay is the director general of the National Centre for Arts and Culture, Banjul, The Gambia. He is credited with establishing the Copyright Collecting Society of The Gambia. From 2014 to 2017, he was Member University of The Gambia Governing Council.

Ceesay wants to make history accessible. He has set up a project to digitise records.

Ceesay has spoken about the lack of historical and archaeological expertise in The Gambia, and the need to increase expertise and capacity in these areas. He has said "Preserving our history and culture is going to boost our economy and restore our identity. We should encourage the study of our history. Gambian history is still there to be researched and written about. Every day we are ashamed and embarrassed, sometimes even humiliated because simple aspect of our history has been lost to us".

Ceesay is a well-known face on Gambian television, where he frequently speaks on history topics and issues.

== Works ==
=== Books ===
- Gambian Women: an Introductory History, Fulladu Publishers, Banjul 2007. 135 pages. First, Second, Third and Fourth editions.
- (Co-author) Ceremonies of The Gambia, 2004, 100 pages
- Gambian Women: Profiles and Historical Notes, Fulladu Publishers, 2011, ISBN 998399264-7, 120 pages.
- (Co-editor) A Guide to Historic Sites and Monuments: Sites of The Gambia, Fulladu Publishers, 2012. ISBN 978 9983 95 574 3
- Patriots: profiles of eminent Gambians, Global Hands Publishing, Leicester, UK, 2016.
- (ed. with Pierre Gomez) A Geocritical Representation of Banjul (Bathurst): 1816-2016, Global Hands Publishing, 2018.
- Founding Father: P.S. Njie, a moral biography, Gambia National Museum Books, 2018

=== Encyclopedic contributions ===
- ‘Dr Florence Mahoney’; ‘Fatou Khan’; ‘Louise N'Jie’; Sally Njie’; ‘Fatou Bensouda’ in Dictionary of African Biography, edited by Henry Louis Gates Jr. and Emmanuel K. Akyeampong, Oxford University Press, 2011.
- 'Ada Beigh'; 'Hannah Mahoney'; 'Wilfred Davidson Carrol'; 'Matarr Ceesay'; 'Mama Tamba Jammeh'; John Colley Faye'; 'Cecelia Mary Ruth Cole'; 'Momodou Musa Njie'; 'Kemintang'; 'Marion Foon'; 'Maryann Gabbidon'; in Oxford African American Studies Centre: The Online authority on the African American Experience.
