= American Embassy School =

American Embassy School may refer to:

- American Embassy School, New Delhi
- Banjul American Embassy School, now Banjul American International School
- American Embassy School, which merged into the International School of Beijing
