= Marina International School =

International school in Banjul, the Gambia

Coordinates: 13.4716°N 16.6873°W

Marina International School is an international school in the Banjul area of the Gambia. It was founded in 1958 by a group of Gambians and British Expatriates, and is one of the oldest and most prestigious schools in the Gambia. Today, it provides an education for boys and girls of three to eighteen years of age, and follows the Cambridge International Curriculum at all levels, preparing children to sit IGCSEs at 16 (Form Five) and A-Levels at 18 (Form Seven). The School is a not-for-profit organisation governed by a board elected from the parent body and is an accredited member of the Council of British International Schools (COBIS).

The school educates both Gambian and non-Gambian students, with different tuition fees for students of different ages and nationalities. A grant by the federal government of the United States was discontinued in 1984 when the Banjul American Embassy School (BAES) was established.

== See also ==
- Education in the Gambia
- List of international schools
- List of schools in the Gambia
