= École Française de Banjul =

Coordinates: 13.4478°N 16.6791°W

- Bakau; The Gambia

Information
- School type: International School
- Established: 1984; 42 years ago
- Language: French

École Française de Banjul is a French international school in Bakau, The Gambia, in the Banjul metropolitan area. It serves levels preschool through première; classes use the National Centre for Distance Education (CNED) beginning in sixième. It was established in 1984.

== See also ==
- Education in the Gambia
- List of international schools
- List of schools in the Gambia
