= Eden House =

Eden House may refer to:

- Child and Parent Resource Institute, London, Ontario, Canada
- Eden House (Gambia), Brufut, the Gambia
- The Eden House, a gothic rock band from the UK
- Eden House (play), a 1969 play by Hal Porter
