= Banjul American International School =

Coordinates: 13.4775°N 16.6840°W

- Banjul; The Gambia

Information
- Former name: Banjul American Embassy School
- School type: International School
- Established: 1984
- Language: English
- Website: https://www.baisgambia.org/

Banjul American International School (BAIS) is an American international school in the Banjul area of the Gambia. Formerly titled the Banjul American Embassy School (BAES), the school serves preschool through high school.

== Overview ==
The school is accredited through 2023 by the Middle States Association of Schools and Colleges. It uses the American Education Reaches Out (AERO) Standards as the base of inquiry-based units planned through the Understanding by Design approach. The school held its 35th anniversary in 2019.

American parents established the school in January 1984 after feeling dissatisfied with the education in the Marina International School, which had previously educated American children. The BAES high school began operations in 2012. The University of Nebraska–Lincoln provides high school correspondence courses to students at BAES.

Student results on external standardized testing show the majority of students achieving above norms and students have left BAIS to find success in schools around the world.

== See also ==
- Education in the Gambia
- List of international schools
- List of schools in the Gambia
