= Armitage High School =

Armitage School
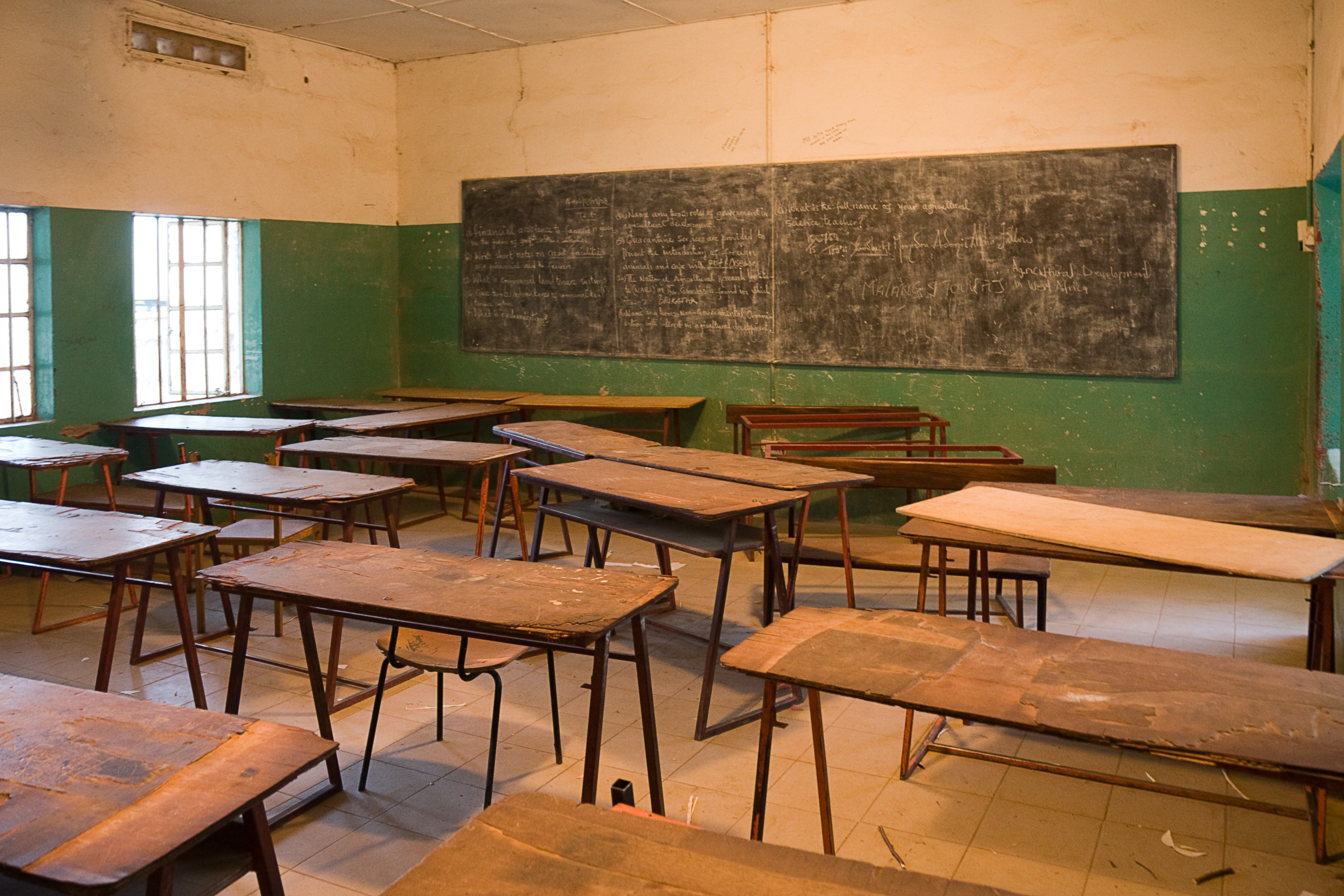
- Classroom at Armitage High School

Location
- Janjanbureh; Gambia; 13.542407°N 14.767725°W

Information
- Type: High school
- Motto: Enter to learn go forward to serve
- Established: 1927; 99 years ago
- Founder: Governor Cecil Hamilton Armitage

Armitage Senior Secondary School is one of the oldest schools in the Gambia. Armitage is a boarding school located in Georgetown (now Janjanbureh). was established in January 1927 by Governor Sir Cecil Hamilton Armitage, after whom the school is named.

== History ==
Armitage school was established in 1927 with the aim of providing education to the children of colonial chiefs and wealthy individuals in rural Gambia.

== Notable alumni ==
- Sheriff Dibba, a People's Progressive Party politician of the 1960s and 1970s
- Sheriff Sisay, a People's Progressive Party politician of the 1960s and 1970s
- Isatou Njie Saidy, Vice President of the Gambia, and Secretary of State (Minister) for Women's Affairs, from 20 March 1997 to 18 January 2017.

== Principals ==
- 1927-1931: Simon Gomez

== See also ==
- Education in the Gambia
- List of boarding schools
- List of schools in the Gambia
- List of alumni of Armitage High School
