= List of museums in the Gambia =

This is a list of museums in the Gambia.

== List ==
- African Heritage Museum
- Katchikally Museum and Crocodile Pool
- Tanje Village Museum
- The Gambia National Museum

== See also ==
- List of museums
