= Modou Badjie =

Gambian footballer

Personal information
- Full name: Modou Lamin Badjie
- Date of birth: 2 January 1997 (age 29)
- Place of birth: Banjul, The Gambia
- Position: Midfielder

Team information
- Current team: Atalanta

Youth career
- Banjul United
- Hemsworth
- –2016: Real de Banjul
- 2016: → Atalanta (loan)
- 2017: Atalanta

Senior career*
Years	Team	Apps	(Gls)
2017–	Atalanta	0	(0)
2017	→ Modena (loan)	4	(0)
2018	→ Catanzaro (loan)	6	(0)
2018–2019	→ Rimini (loan)	16	(1)
- * Club domestic league appearances and goals as of 26 May 2019

Modou Lamin Badjie (born 2 January 1997) is a Gambian football player. He is under contract with the Italian club Atalanta, but is not registered to play for them for the 2019–20 season.

== Club career ==
He made his Serie C debut for Modena on 27 August 2017 in a game against Sambenedettese.
