= Gambia National Museum =

National Museum of The Gambia
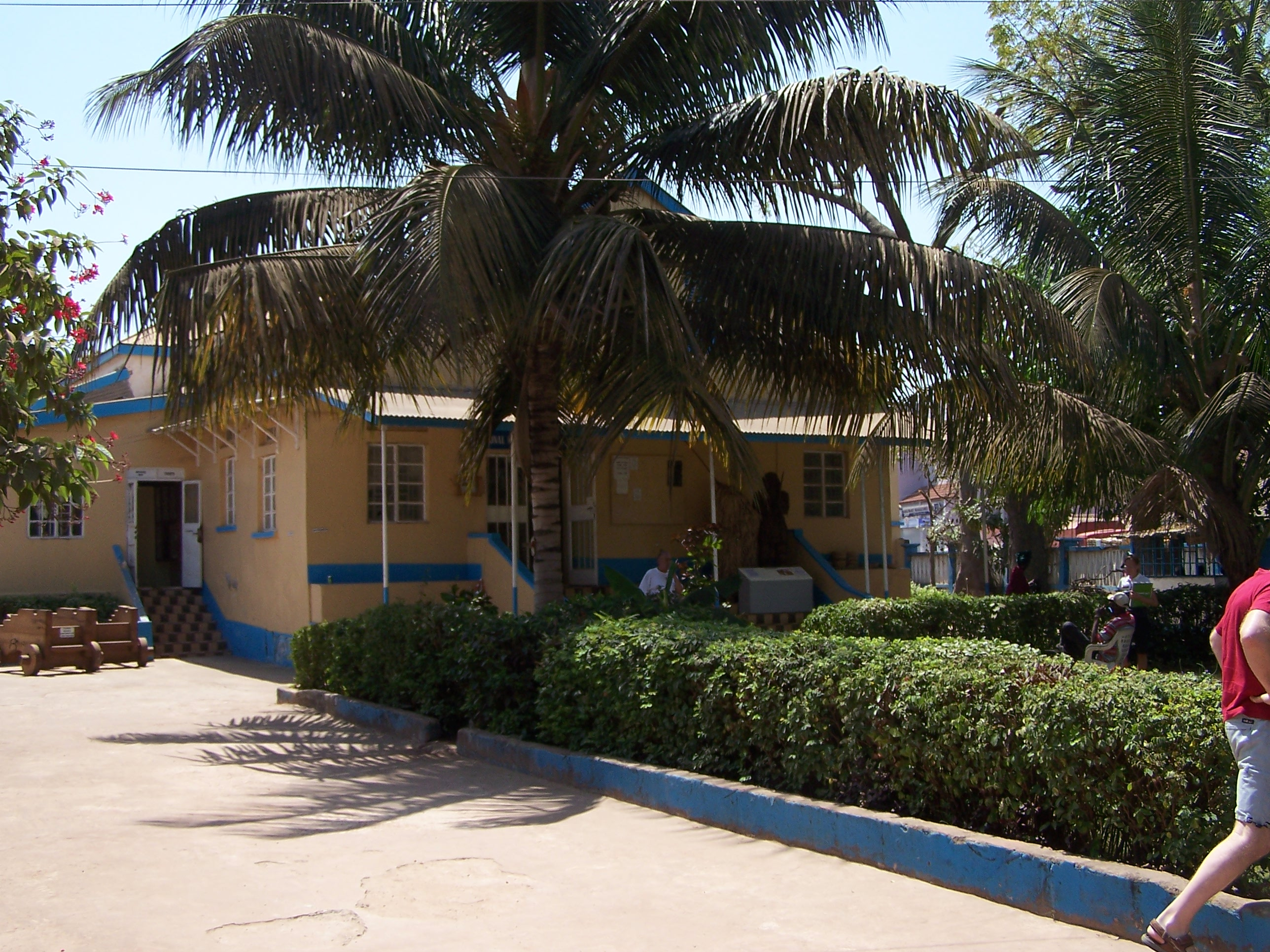

- The Gambia
- Established: 1985
- Location: Banjul, the Gambia in the city centre
- Coordinates: 13.456°N 16.576°W
- Type: Prehistory, culture, history and a natural history museum
- Visitors: During the year 2011–2012, a total of 15,000 visitors mainly school parties and foreign tourists.
- Director: Mr Baba Ceesay
- Curator: Mr. Hassoum Ceesay
- Public transit access: The museum can be accessed through a road entering the Capital City, Banjul
- Website: www.ncac.gm

The National Museum of The Gambia is a Gambian cultural museum located in Banjul. It is home to historical documents and displays concerning the History of the Gambia.

== History ==
The Gambia National Museum opened in 1985, fifteen years after the Friends of the National Museum Association was established in 1970. The 1974 Monuments and Relics Act followed, which set into motion the plans for the National Museum. The museum's primary goal is the collection and preservation of artifacts documenting the material culture of the Gambia, as well as to educate both visitors to the country and residents who may not be familiar with Gambian history.

Discussions about starting a national museum started in the 1960s, and for the two decades leading up to the museum's inauguration, historians and archaeologists collected artifacts and information on Gambian and West African history and culture. Bakari Sidibe, Abdoulie Bayo and Baba Ceesay were pioneer staff of the new museum.

At the Gambia National Museum, you can learn about the cultural heritage of the Gambia, like who the Super Eagles were and what a masquerade is. In late 1999, Hassoum Ceesay, a new graduate in history, became Curator and soon worked with his superior officer, Baba Ceesay, to revamp a part of the original exhibition with a display on the history and Culture and Banjul, the capital. As curator, Hassoum also instituted children's museum activities, such as art classes and history video shows and a robust fine art temporary art exhibition programme, which exhibited paintings and sculpture by Gambian and foreign artists.

== Museum Description ==
The museum houses three floors of exhibits. The ground floor displays the political and cultural history of the nation's capital, Banjul. On the basement level, you can learn about the musical heritage of the Gambia and see what instruments are popular throughout the country. On the second floor, you can learn about the archaeological history of West Africa and the Gambia. The floor also details the nation's colonial and post- Independence political and economic history. The museum has got a sound educational value. Gambian School children form the largest group of visitors and the museum education programme of art classes, quiz, history video shows etc. has become supplementary to civics and social studies classes. The museum is also the most important tourist attraction in the Greater Banjul Area. It is playing its role in tourism promotion. The museum embodies the countries' cultural and historical identity, with its photo archives detailing over 70 years of Gambian history.

=== Administration ===
The Gambia National Museum is not an autonomous public body. It falls under the administrative purview of the National Centre for Arts and Culture, NCAC. The National Centre for Arts and Culture (NCAC) is a semi- autonomous institution established by an Act of Parliament in 1989, to promote and develop Gambian Culture. It takes care of performing and fine arts, copyright, sites and monuments and museums. There are other public museums under the stable of the NCAC: Arch 22 museum in Banjul; Slavery Museum in Juffureh; Wassu Stone Circles Museum at Wassu, 300 km from Banjul; Fort Bullen Museum in Barra, and the Culture museum at Kerr Batch Stone circles site in the Central River Region. Kachikally sacred crocodile museum in Bakau, 15 km outside Banjul, and Tanji village museum are privately run.

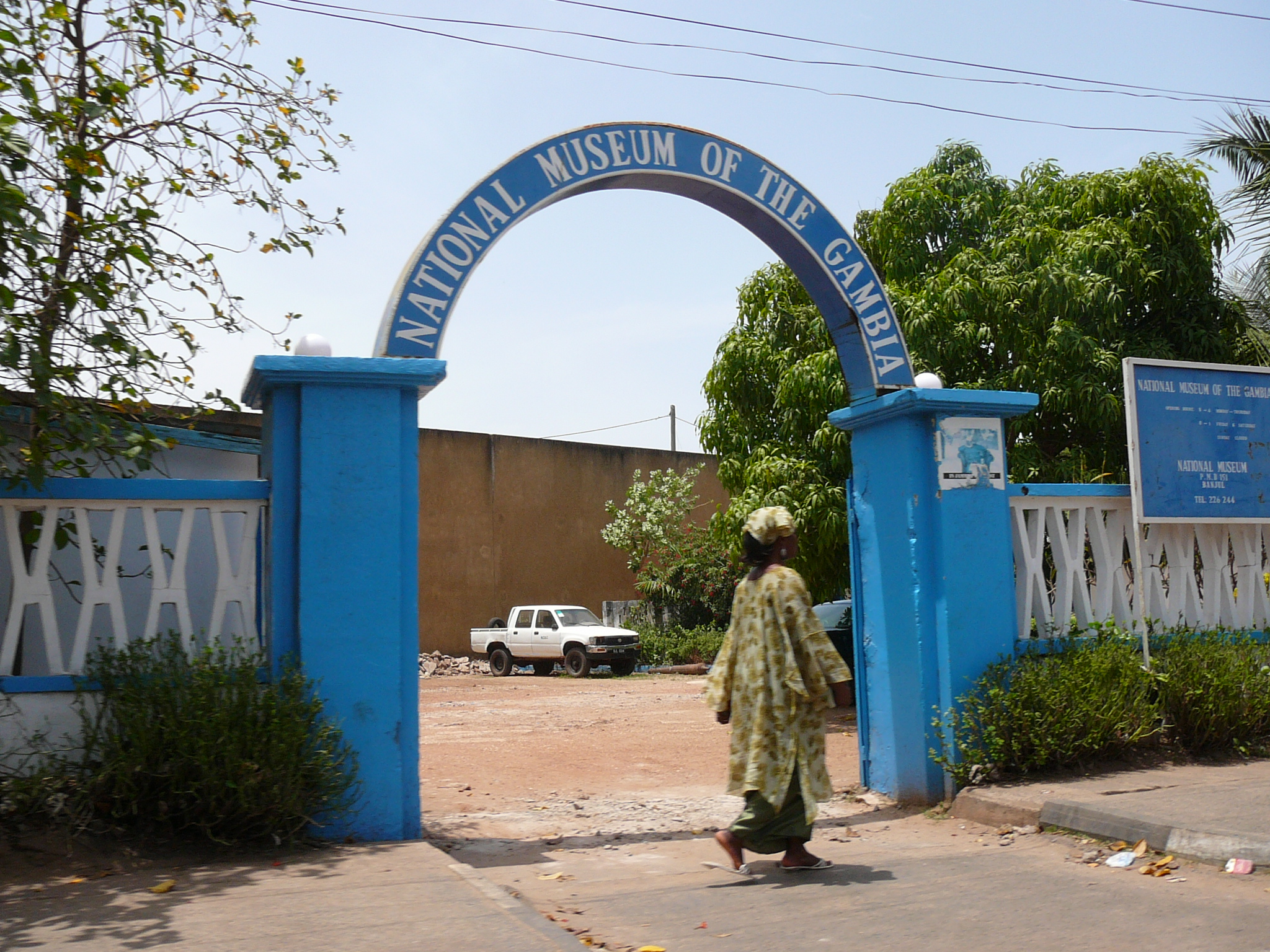
The entrance, Gambia national museum

== Exhibitions ==
=== Portrayal of women ===
Upon initial observation, the presence of women within the exhibits, focusing on the liberation and establishment of the nation's capital (among the first that a visitor would encounter), appears prominent. Women are displayed partaking in various agricultural and household tasks, such as basketry and food preparation. Apart from domestic involvement, perhaps unexpectedly, women are also shown, through photographic display, to have played a part in radical thought and political campaigning. Portraits of individual women are accompanied with captions alluding to the fact that they did indeed hold positions of distinction and respect within the early Bathurst society. In summary, women are shown in traditional dress, as educators within the school system, as members of active social clubs, as participants in religious pilgrimages to Mecca, as icons of beauty and as mothers, striving towards the continuity of their families.

== VIP Visitors ==
Among distinguished visitors to the Gambia National Museum are the President Ma of Taiwan and Rev. Jesse Jackson of the United States in 2012.

== See also ==
- List of museums in the Gambia
