= Banjul District =

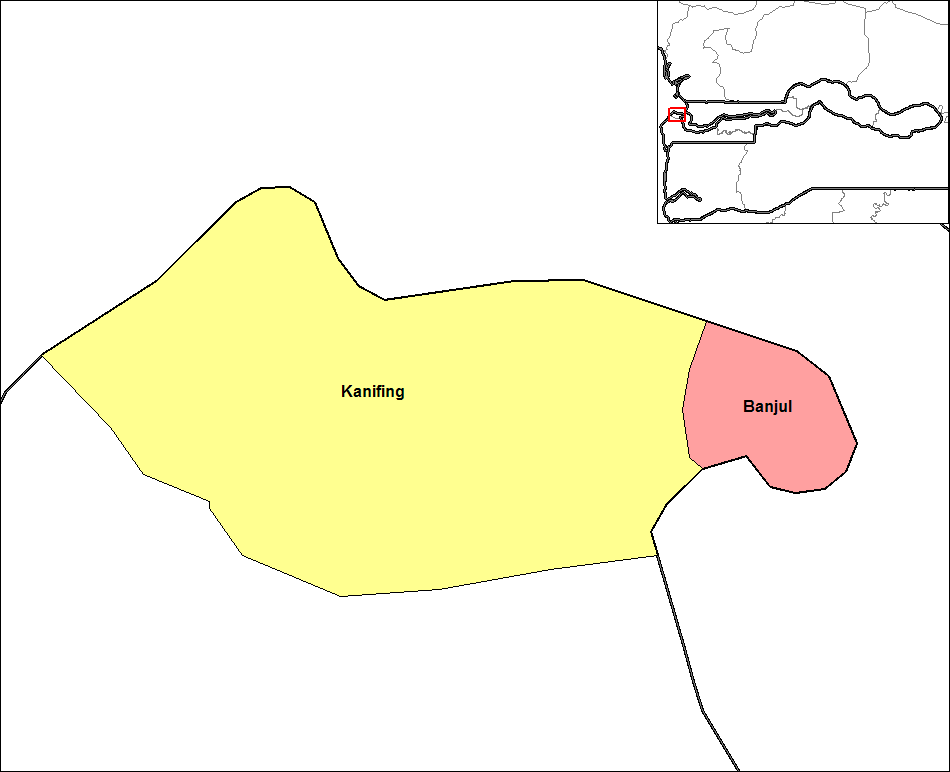
Banjul is by far the smaller of the two districts of Banjul Division.

Banjul is a district in the Banjul Local Government Area of the Gambia.
