= Arch 22 =

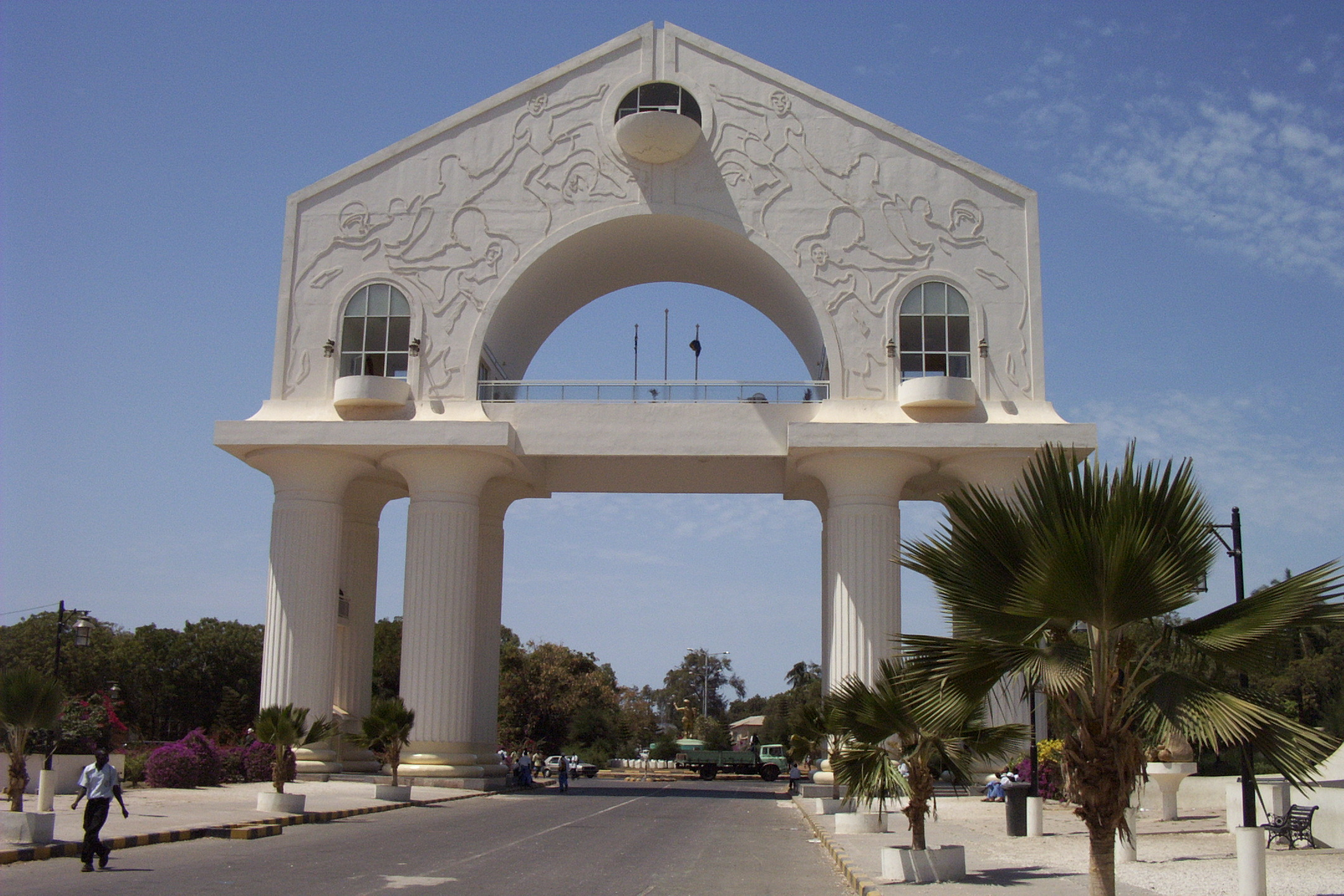
- Arch 22 serves as a distinctive gateway to the Gambian capital.

- Location within The Gambia

General information
- Type: City gate
- Architectural style: Neoclassical
- Location: Banjul, the Gambia
- Coordinates: 13.460°N 16.582°W
- Construction started: 1996

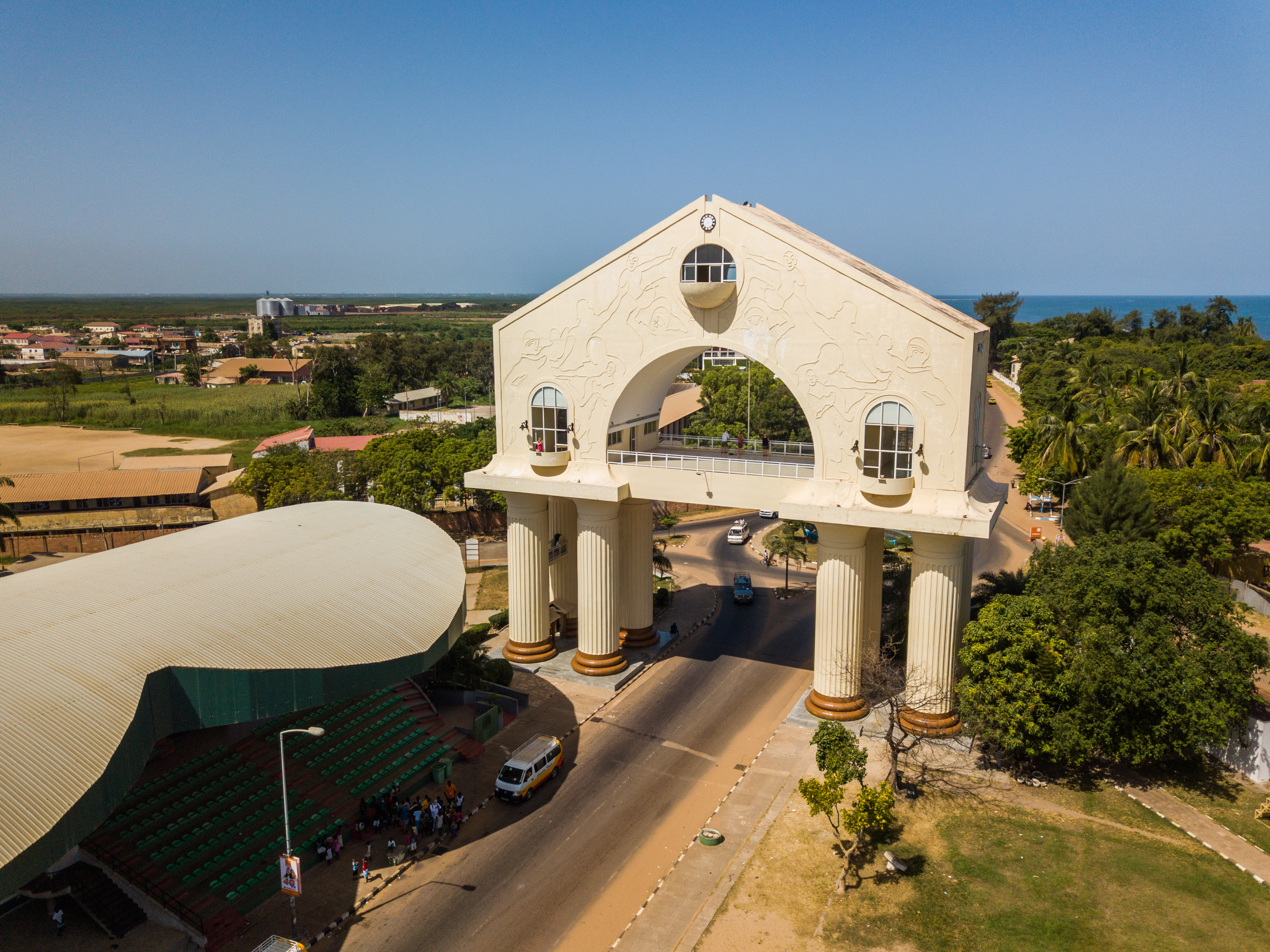
Arch 22 photographed with a drone

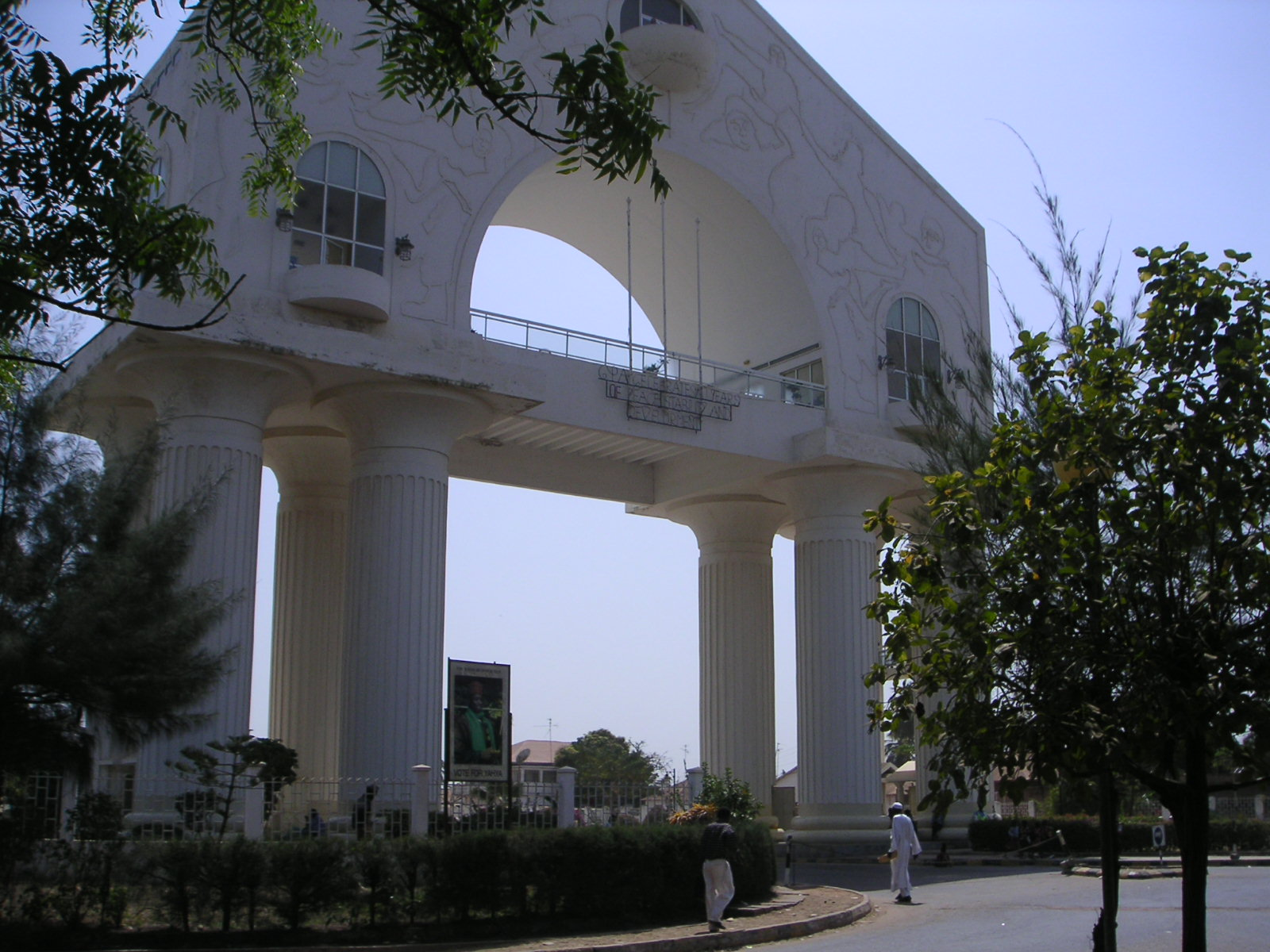

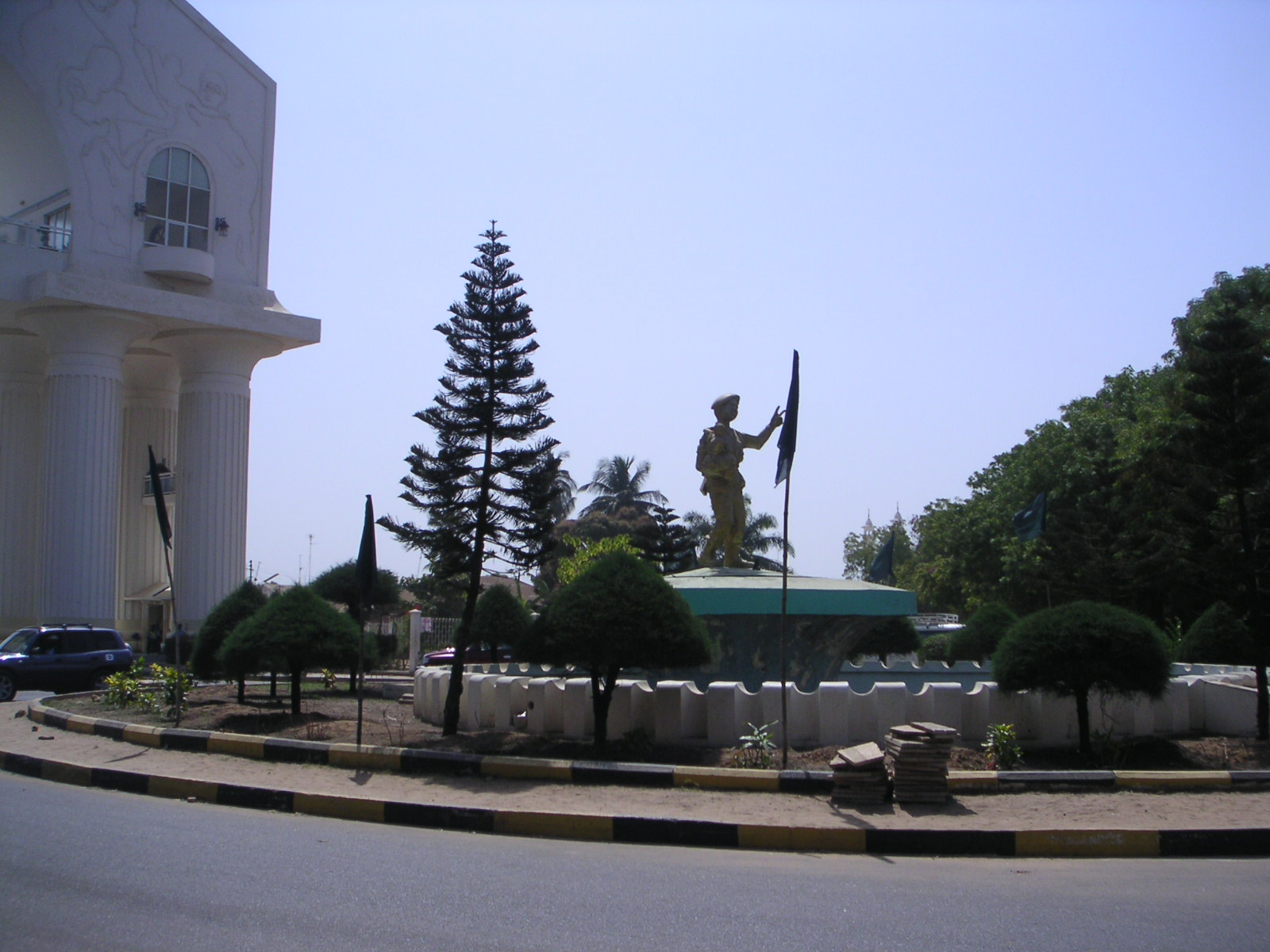
The statue of the "unknown soldier" stands close to the base of the arch.

Arch 22 is a commemorative arch on the road into Banjul in the Gambia. It was built in 1996 to mark the military coup d'état of 22 July 1994, through which Yahya Jammeh and his Armed Forces Provisional Ruling Council overthrew the democratically elected Gambian government of President Sir Dawda Jawara.

The arch stands on the Banjul-Serrekunda Highway, near the traffic island at the intersection with Box Bar Road, Independence Drive, and Marina Parade. A statue of the "unknown soldier" can be seen near the base of the arch: the soldier has a rifle strapped to his back and carries a baby in one hand while signaling victory (making a V-sign) with the other.

Arch 22 is depicted on the back of the 100-dalasis banknote.

== Construction ==
The arch was designed by Senegalese architect Pierre Goudiaby, who also designed the Banjul International Airport and the African Renaissance Monument in Dakar, Senegal.

At 35 metres, the arch is one of the tallest structures in the Gambia. The building stands on eight columns and has three floors. Access to the upper floors can be made through several elevators and spiral cases.

The first floor is at an intermediate level in the columns. The gallery on the second floor provides a panorama of the city, with the view extending down to the sea port of Banjul and the mangrove forests of Tanbi Wetland Complex. On the top floor is a small textile museum.
