= Banjul =

Capital of The Gambia

Banjul ߓߊ߲߬ߖߎߟ Banjul [baⁿdʒul] 𞤄𞤢𞤲𞥆𞤶𞤵𞤤𞤵 Bannjulu
- Capital city
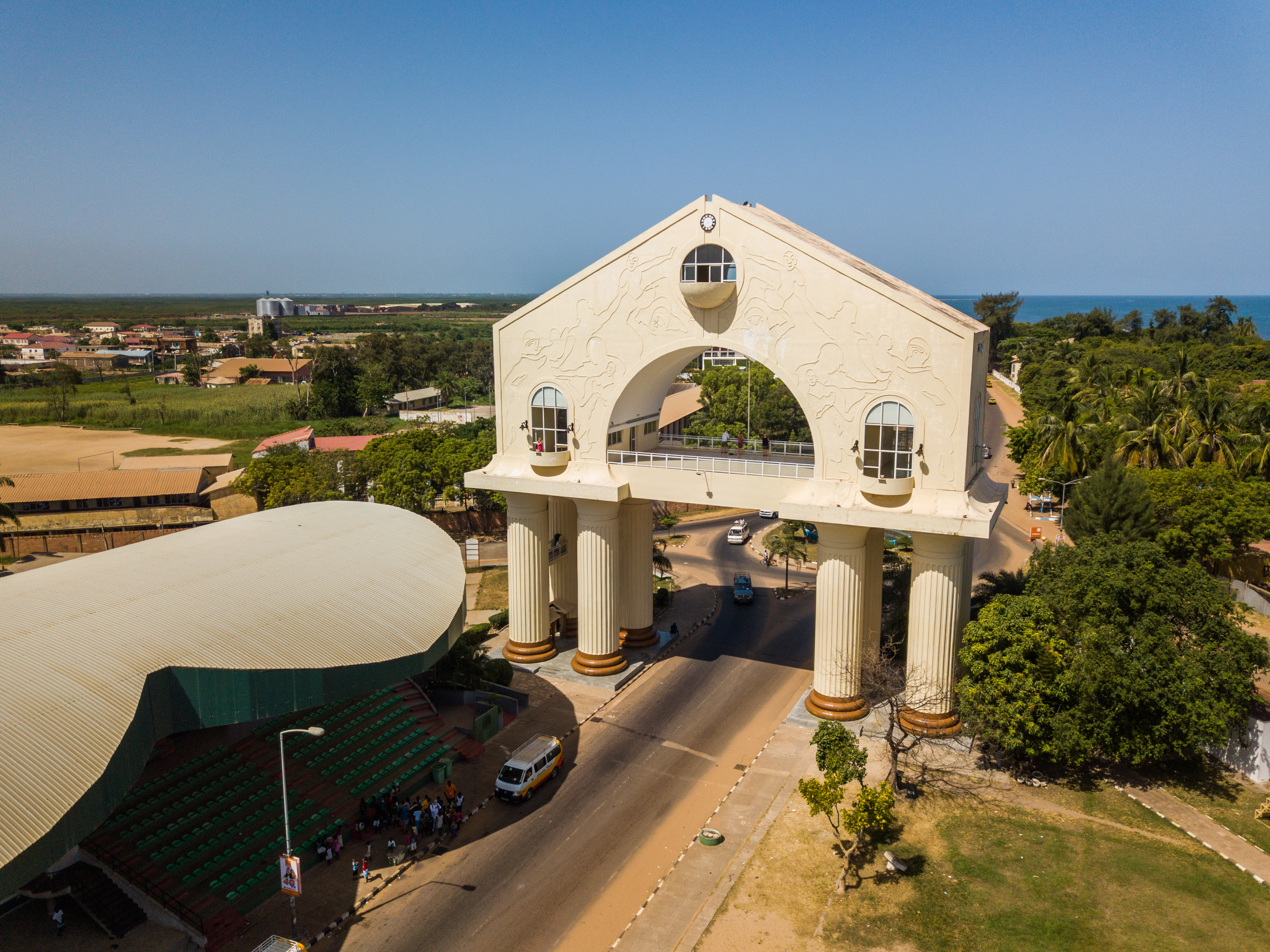
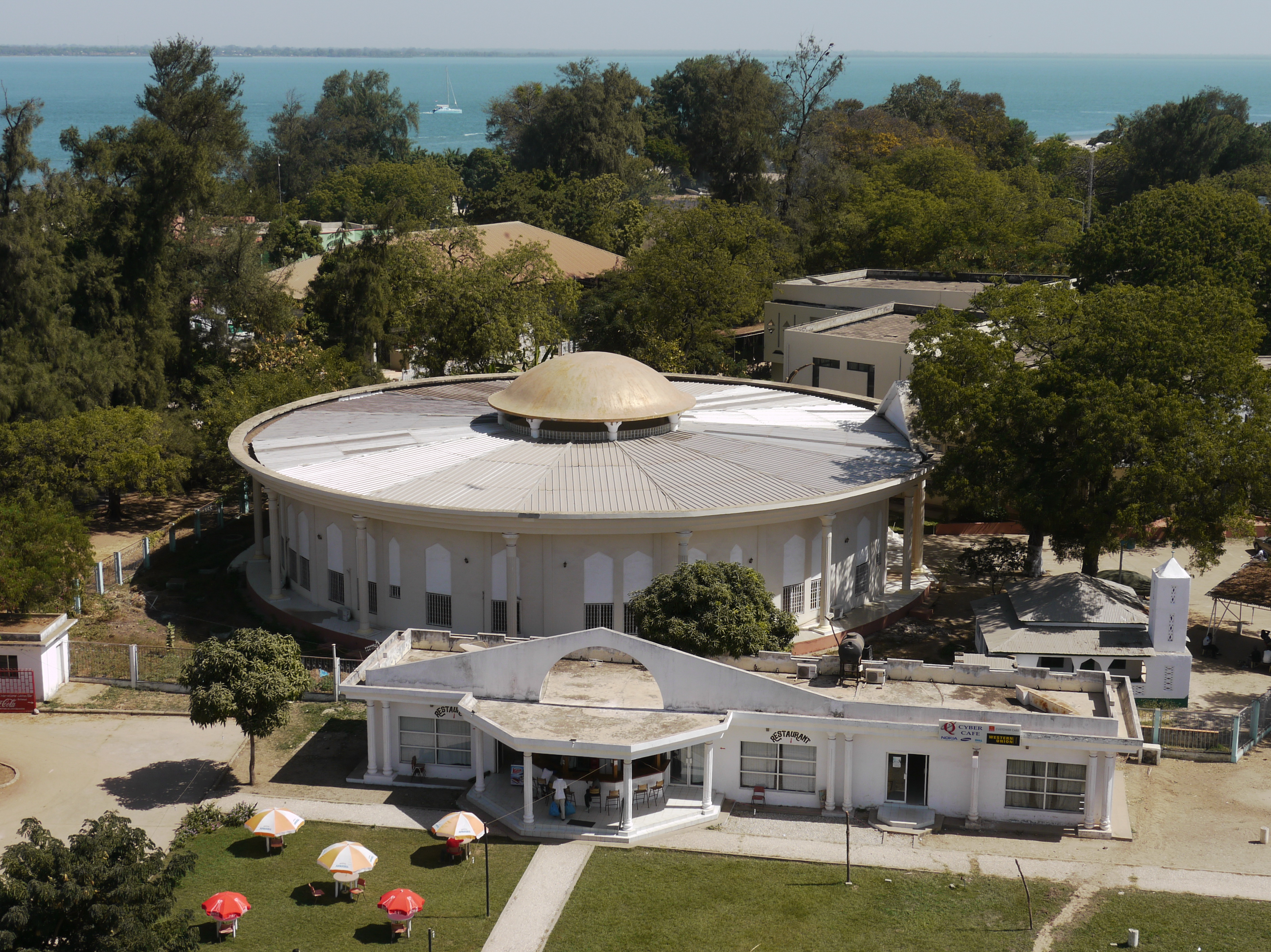
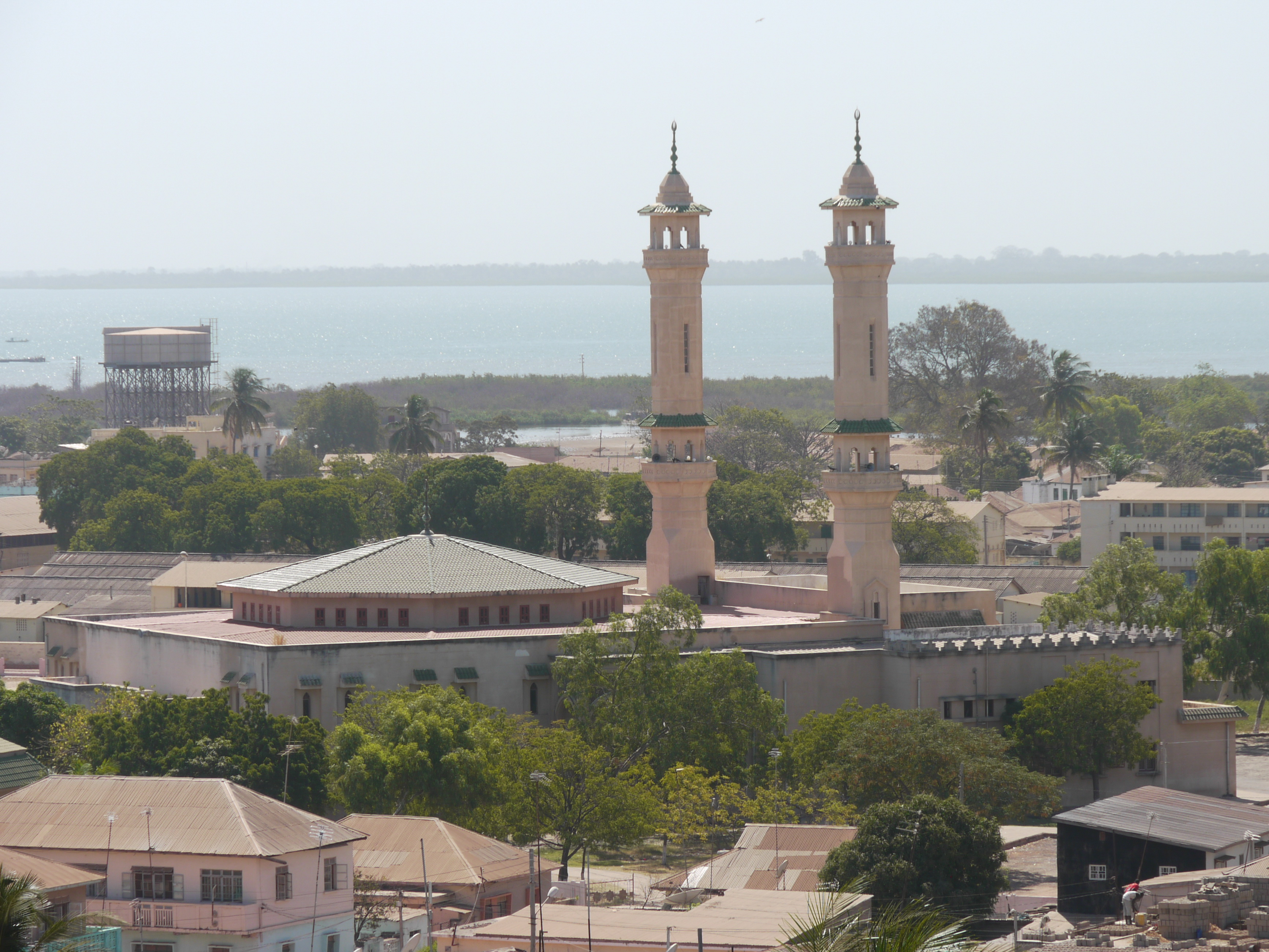
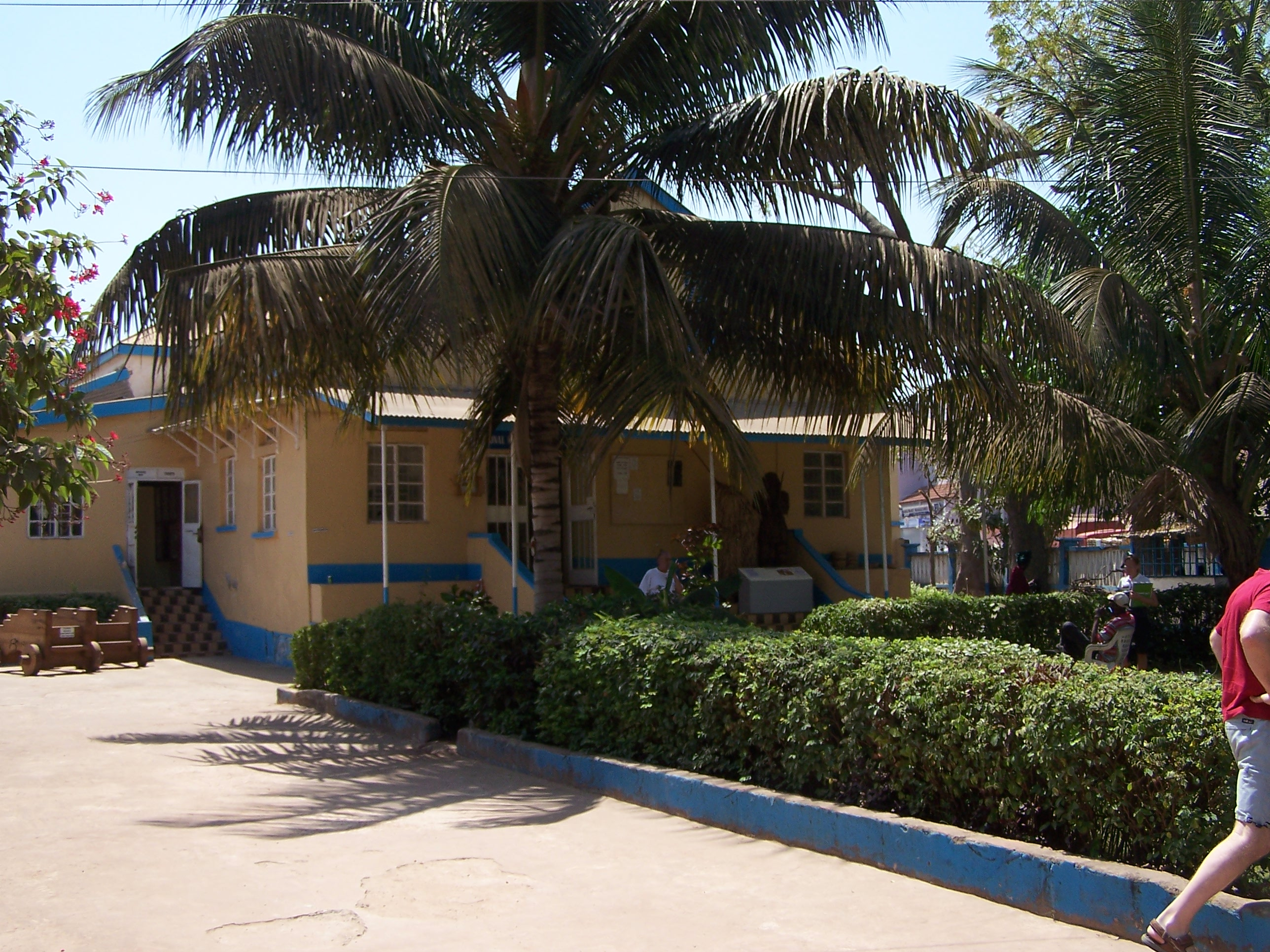
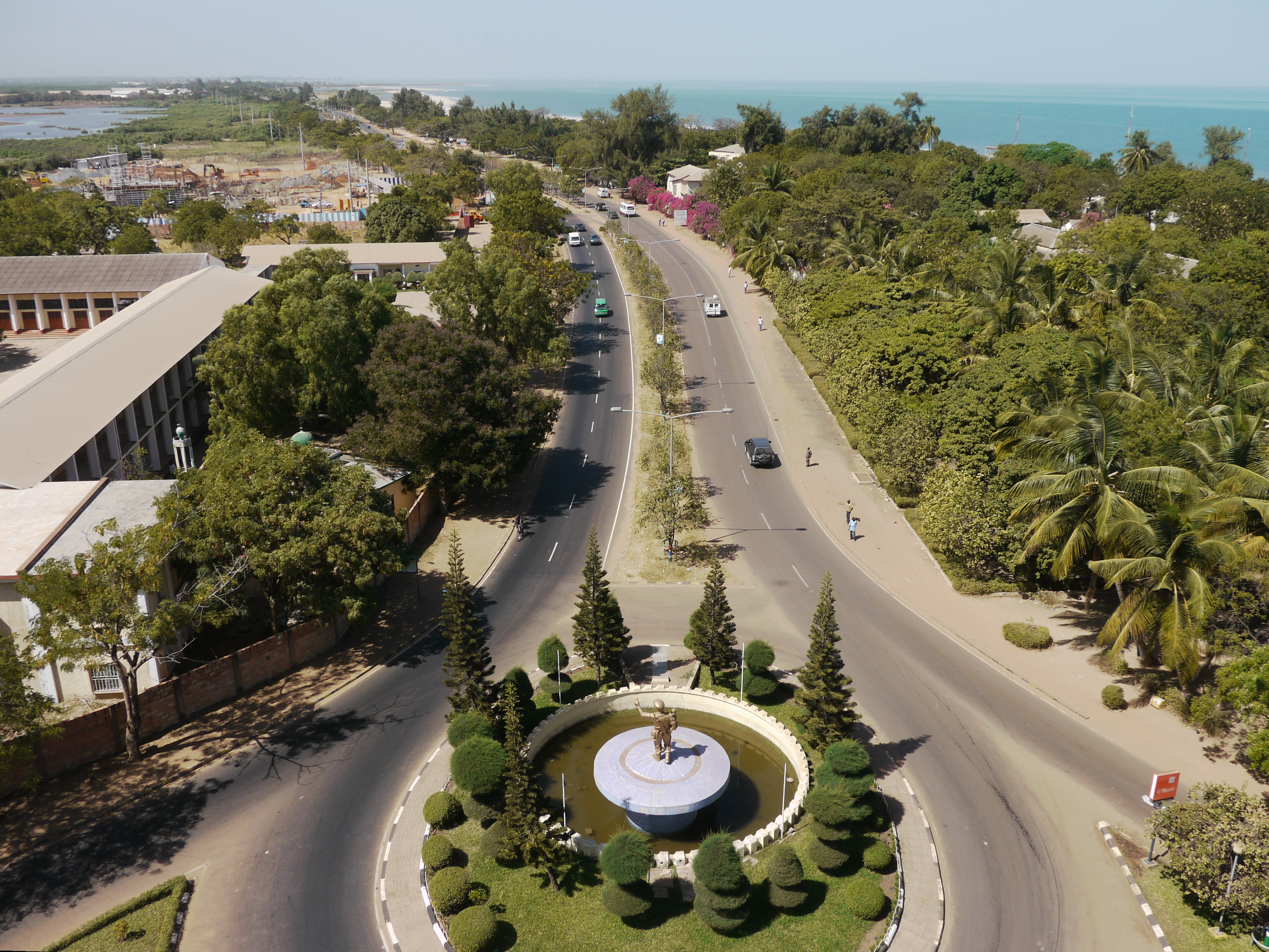
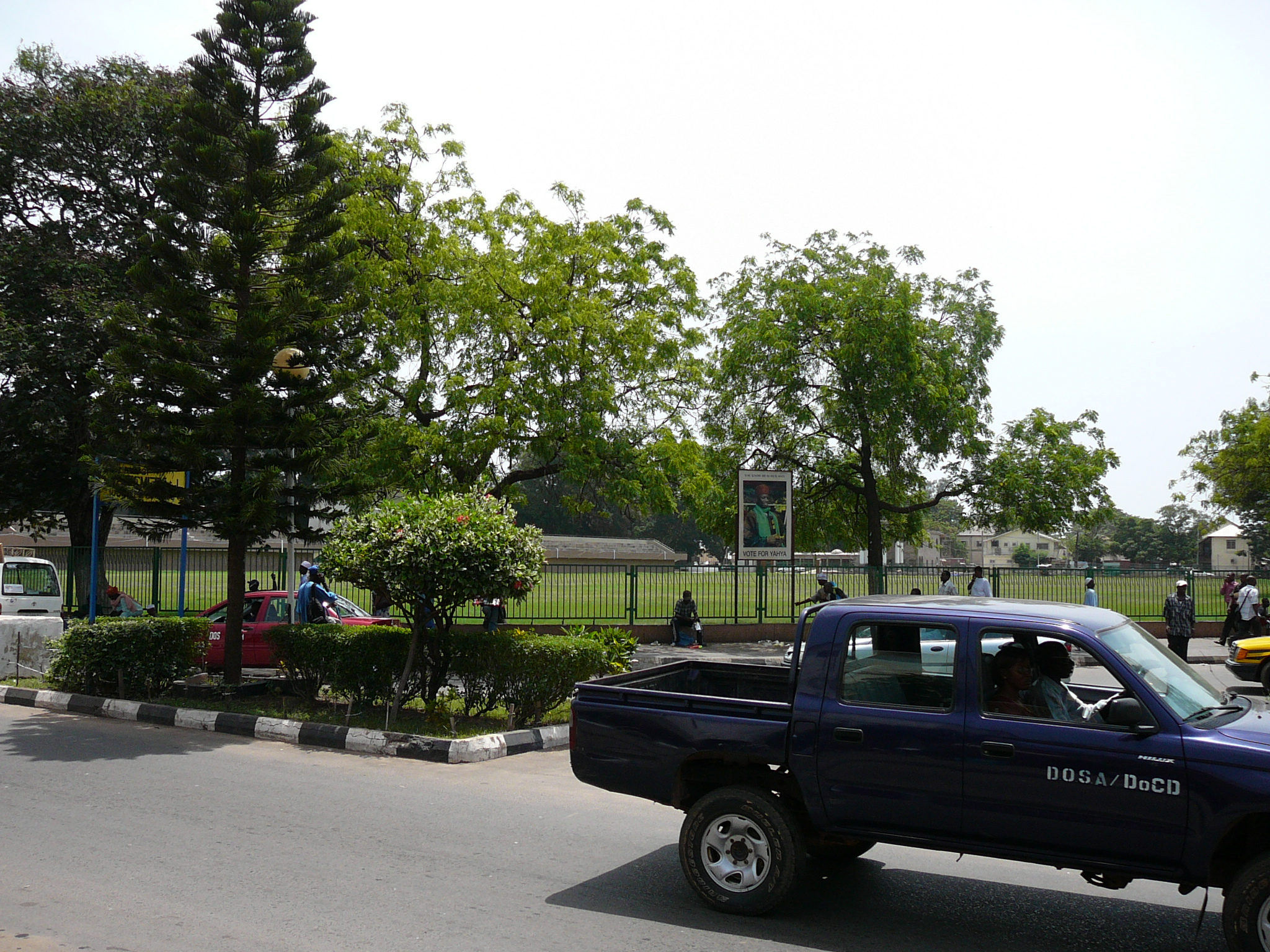
- Arch 22 Gambia National Centre for Arts and Culture Banjul Central Mosque Gambian National Museum Entrance roundabout Independence Square (Banjul)

- Flag Coat of arms

- Location of Banjul Division

- Location in The Gambia Location in Africa
- Coordinates: 13°27′15″N 16°34′31″W
- Country: The Gambia
- Division: Banjul
- Founded: 23 April 1816 as Bathurst

Government
  - Mayor: Rohey Malick Lowe

Area
  - Capital city: 12 km^{2} (4.6 sq mi)
  - Urban: 93 km^{2} (36 sq mi)
- Elevation: 2 m (6.6 ft)

Population (2013 census)
  - Capital city: 31,301
  - Density: 2,600/km^{2} (6,800/sq mi)
  - Urban: 413,397
  - Urban density: 4,400/km^{2} (12,000/sq mi)
- Time zone: UTC±00:00 (GMT)
- HDI (2023): 0.571 medium · 2nd
- Website: www.banjulcity.gm

Banjul (UK: /bænˈdʒuːl/, US: /ˈbɑːndʒuːl/), officially the City of Banjul, is the capital city of the Gambia. The city of Banjul is located on St Mary's Island (Banjul Island), which is in the Gambia River where it enters the Atlantic Ocean.

The population of the city proper is 26,461, with the Greater Banjul Area, which includes the City of Banjul and the Kanifing municipality, at a population of 405,809 (2024 census). The island is connected to the mainland to the west and the rest of Greater Banjul Area via bridges. There are also ferries linking Banjul to the mainland at the other side of the river.

From the 19th century until 24 April 1973, the city was known as Bathurst.

== Etymology ==
There are several etymologies for 'Banjul.' One traditional history recounts that Bandjougou, son of Barafin, came to the island after fleeing the attacks of Soumaoro Kante on the Manding region. His name became attached to the island, and over time changed to 'Bandjoulou'. Another theory claims that Banjul takes its name from Bang julo, the Mandinka word for rope fibre that the Mandinka people gathered on the island.

== History ==
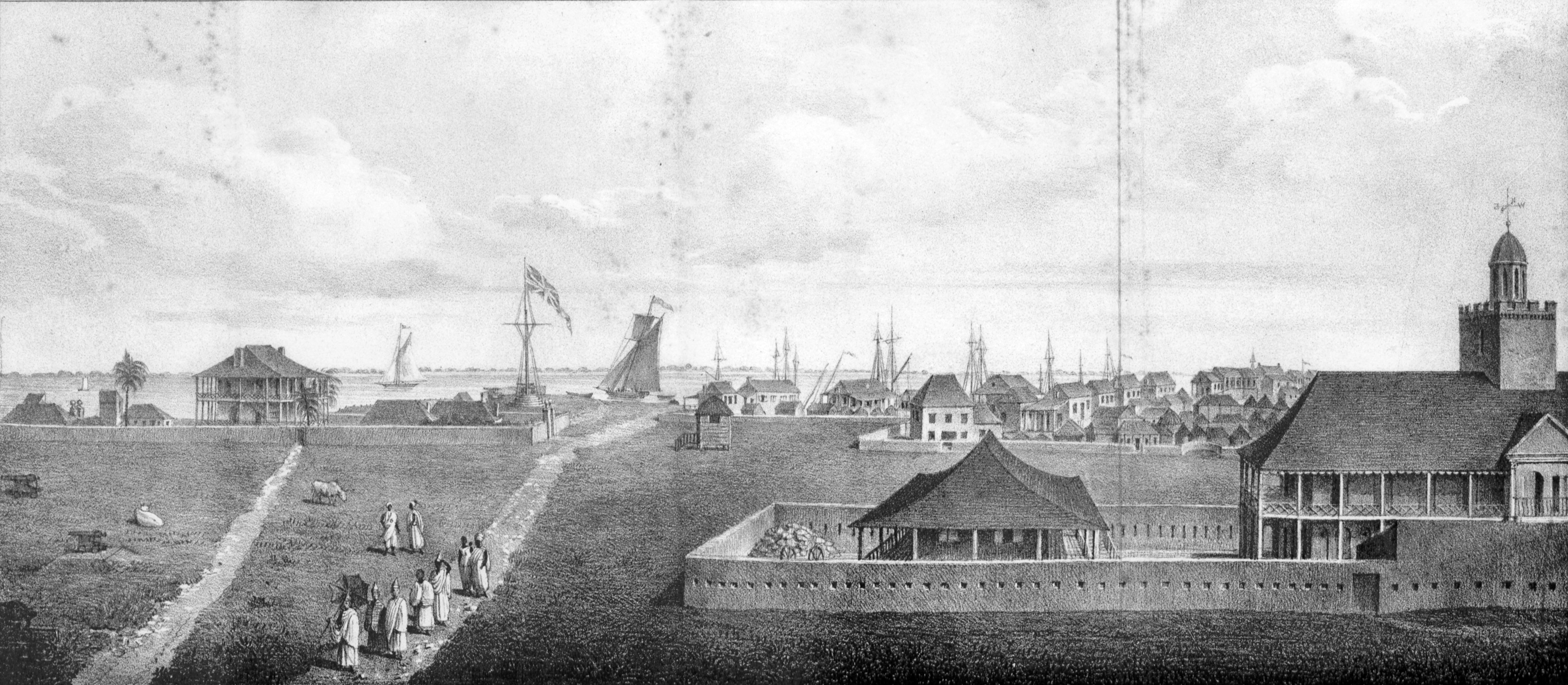
A sketch of Bathurst, published in 1824

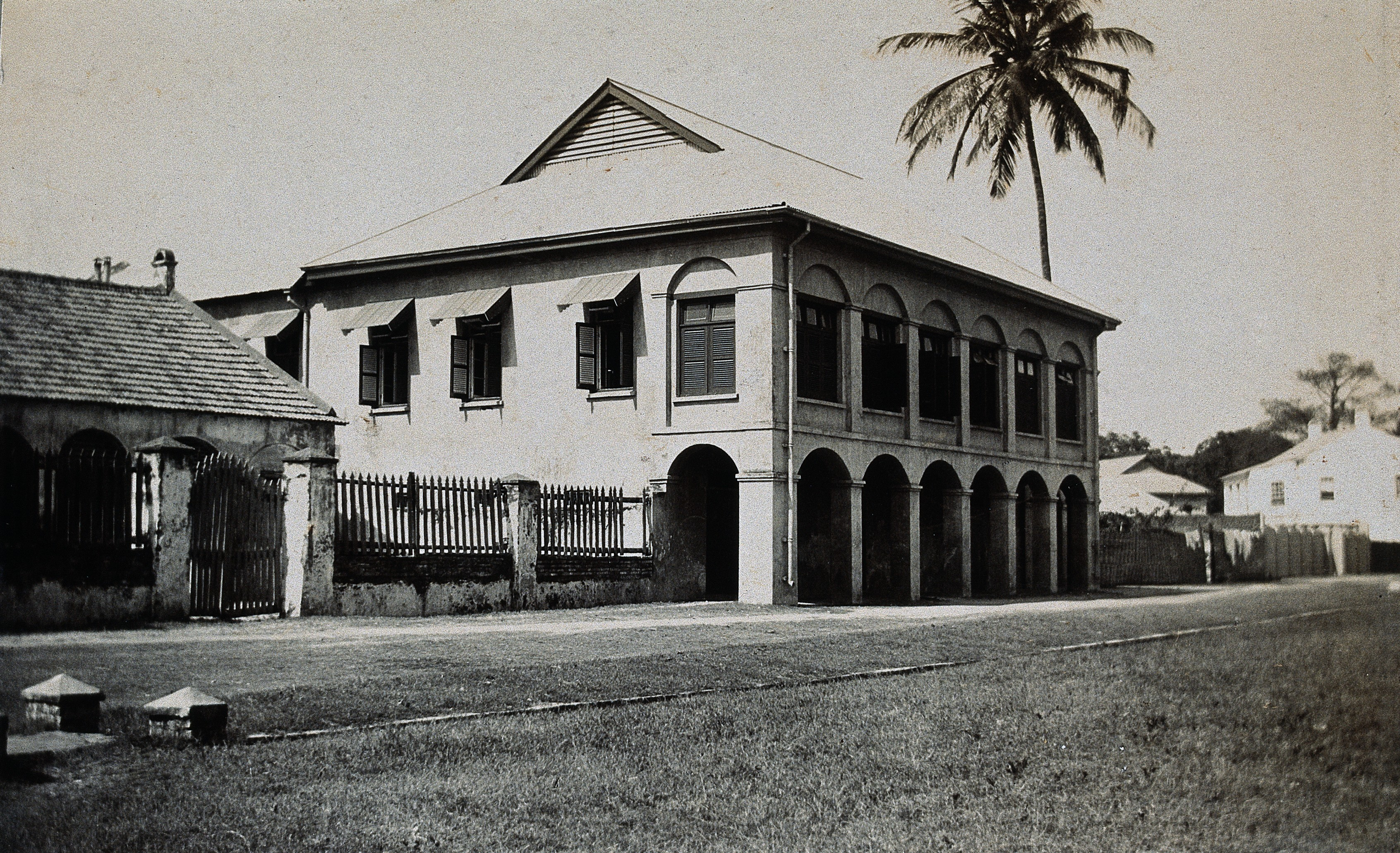
Senior Medical Officers' quarters in Bathurst, Gambia. Photograph, c. 1911.

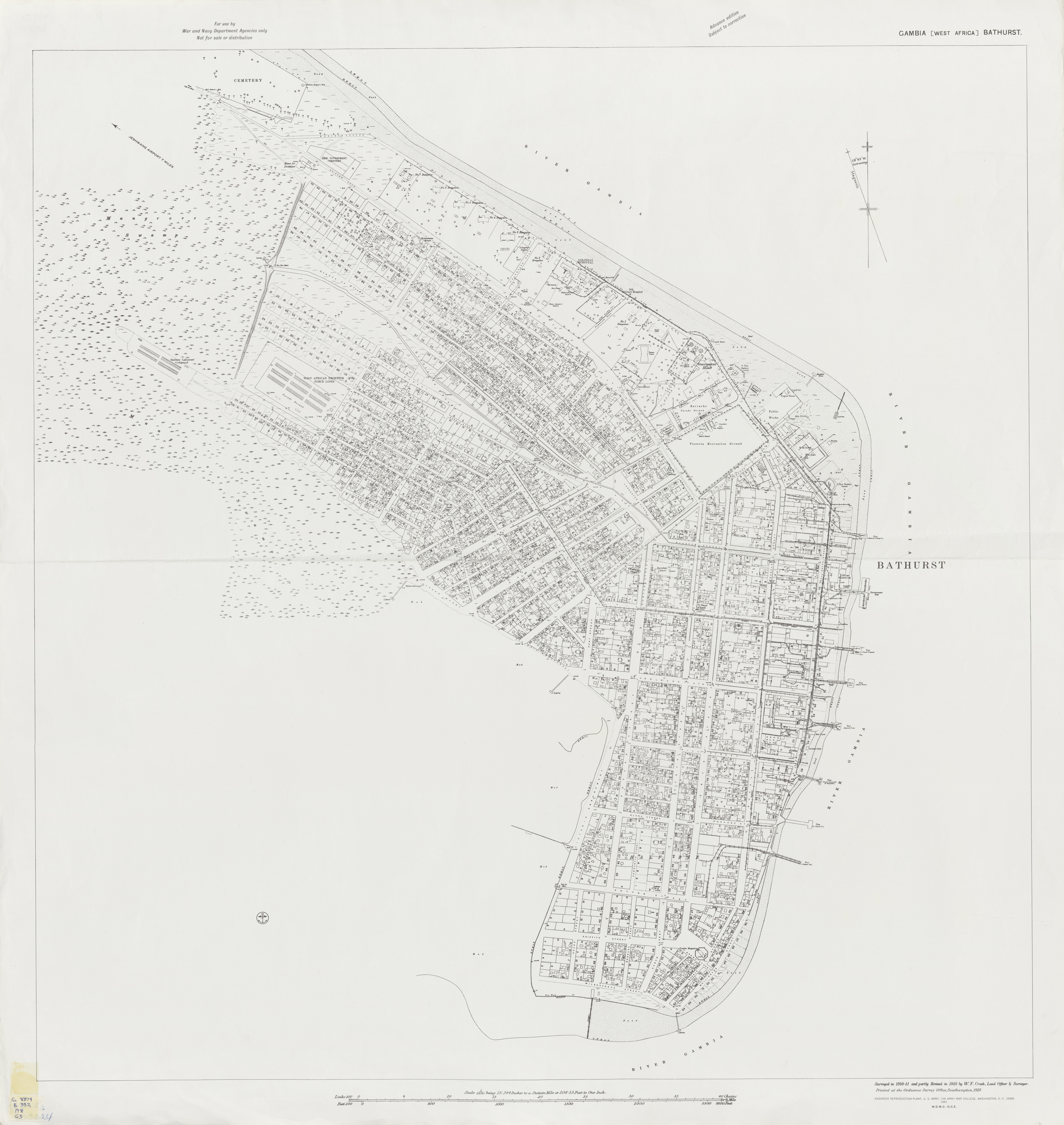
Bathurst [Banjul] 1:2,500 (6.6 MB) and city center Surveyed in 1910-11 and partly Revised in 1918 by W.F. Crook, reprinted by Engineer Reproduction Plant, U.S. Army War College 1941

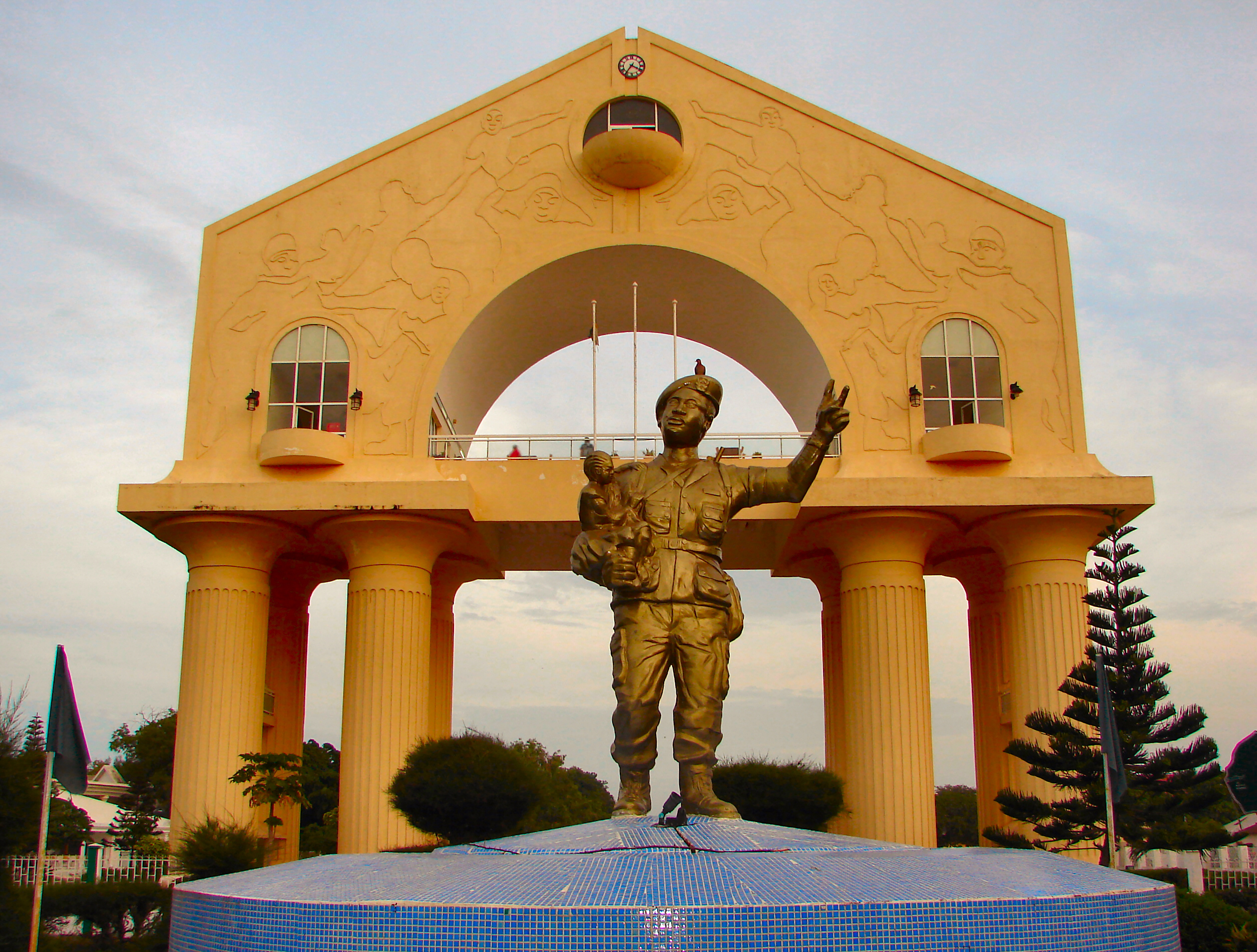
Arch 22 at the entrance to Banjul. The statue of the former president Yahya Jammeh was removed following democratic elections in 2016.

In 1651, Banjul was leased by the Duke of Courland and Semigallia (German: Herzog von Kurland und Semgallen) from the King of Kombo, as part of the Curonian colonization.

On 23 April 1816, Tumani Bojang, the King of Kombo, ceded Banjul Island to Alexander Grant, the British commandant, in exchange for an annual fee of 103 iron bars. Grant's expedition, consisting of 75 men and tasked with establishing a military garrison, had been ordered by Charles MacCarthy. Grant founded Banjul as a trading post and base, constructing houses and barracks for controlling entrance to the Gambia estuary and suppressing the slave trade. The British renamed Banjul Island as St. Mary's Island and named the new town Bathurst, after the 3rd Earl Bathurst, Secretary of State for War and the Colonies at the time. Streets were laid out in a modified grid pattern, and named after Allied generals at the Battle of Waterloo. The town became the centre of British activity in the Gambia Colony and Protectorate.

Within a few years of its establishment, the town started attracting migrants. Its population consisted of Africans of various origins, Levantines (Syrians, Lebanese) as well as Europeans (English, French, Portuguese). A majority of the population was Muslim but there was a significant Christian minority, including the Aku inhabitants. The majority of the Africans consisted of Wolof people, whose population rose from 829 in 1881 to 3,666 in 1901 and then 10,130 in 1944. They had mainly hailed from Gorée and Saint-Louis. The Mandinka were the second largest African group, followed by the Jola as well as the Fula. The Serer people make up 3.5% of the country's demographics. Islamic schools called dara were founded in Bathurst from its early years, resulting in the foundation of the first Muslim court in 1905, in addition to the increasingly more sophisticated British legal framework.

Bathurst was officially declared the capital of the Protectorate of the Gambia in 1889, leading to an increase in population. Through the 20th century, it became an even greater attraction for Gambians due to the availability of jobs fuelled by British colonial activities as well as social activities such as cinemas. Young men from rural farming villages would move to Bathurst to work at the Public Works Department (established in 1922) or docks. The town was an important Allied naval and air hub during World War II, resulting in an increase in population from 14,370 in 1931 to 21,154 in 1944.

After independence, the town's name was changed to Banjul in 1973. On 22 July 1994, Banjul was the scene of a bloodless military coup d'état in which President Sir Dawda Jawara was overthrown and replaced by Yahya Jammeh. To commemorate this event, Arch 22 was built as an entrance portal to the capital. The gate is 35 metres tall and stands at the centre of an open square. It houses a textile museum.

== Climate ==
Banjul features hot weather year round. Under the Köppen climate classification, Banjul features a tropical wet and dry climate (Aw). The city features a lengthy dry season, spanning from November to May and a relatively short wet season covering the remaining five months. However, during those five months, Banjul tends to see heavy rainfall. August is usually the rainiest month, with on average 350 millimetres or 14 inches of rainfall. Maximum temperatures are somewhat constant, though morning minima tend to be hotter during the wet season than the dry season.

According to a Gambian government minister, Banjul is at risk of submerging under water by a metre rise in sea levels as a result of climate change and global warming.

Climate data for Banjul (1991-2020)
Month	Jan	Feb	Mar	Apr	May	Jun	Jul	Aug	Sep	Oct	Nov	Dec	Year
Mean daily maximum °C (°F)	32.5 (90.5)	33.2 (91.8)	32.9 (91.2)	31.8 (89.2)	31.6 (88.9)	32.3 (90.1)	31.8 (89.2)	31.6 (88.9)	32.1 (89.8)	33.6 (92.5)	34.0 (93.2)	33.1 (91.6)	32.5 (90.5)
Daily mean °C (°F)	25.3 (77.5)	25.9 (78.6)	26.3 (79.3)	26.1 (79.0)	26.5 (79.7)	27.5 (81.5)	27.7 (81.9)	27.7 (81.9)	27.9 (82.2)	28.9 (84.0)	28.4 (83.1)	26.6 (79.9)	27.1 (80.8)
Mean daily minimum °C (°F)	18.3 (64.9)	18.7 (65.7)	19.9 (67.8)	20.3 (68.5)	21.2 (70.2)	22.7 (72.9)	23.7 (74.7)	23.8 (74.8)	23.7 (74.7)	24.1 (75.4)	22.7 (72.9)	20.1 (68.2)	21.6 (70.9)
Average precipitation mm (inches)	0.7 (0.03)	0.9 (0.04)	0.0 (0.0)	0.0 (0.0)	2.5 (0.10)	76.4 (3.01)	174.8 (6.88)	353.6 (13.92)	244.1 (9.61)	54.7 (2.15)	1.3 (0.05)	0.2 (0.01)	909.2 (35.80)
Average precipitation days (≥ 1.0 mm)	0.1	0.2	0.0	0.0	0.1	4.4	11.4	15.6	13.7	3.3	0.1	0.1	49.0
Average relative humidity (%)	47	47	50	58	67	73	81	85	84	80	69	55	67
Mean monthly sunshine hours	207.7	237.3	266.6	252.0	229.4	201.0	182.9	189.1	183.0	217.0	246.0	210.8	2,622.8
Mean daily sunshine hours	6.7	8.4	8.6	8.4	7.4	6.7	5.9	6.1	6.1	7.0	8.2	6.8	7.2
Source 1: World Meteorological Organization
Source 2: Deutscher Wetterdienst (humidity and sun)

Banjul mean sea temperature
Jan	Feb	Mar	Apr	May	Jun	Jul	Aug	Sep	Oct	Nov	Dec	Year
22 °C (72 °F)	21 °C (70 °F)	21 °C (70 °F)	22 °C (72 °F)	24 °C (75 °F)	26 °C (79 °F)	27 °C (81 °F)	27 °C (81 °F)	27 °C (81 °F)	27 °C (81 °F)	27 °C (81 °F)	24 °C (75 °F)	25 °C (77 °F)

=== Climate change ===
A 2019 paper published in PLOS One estimated that under Representative Concentration Pathway 4.5, a "moderate" scenario of climate change where global warming reaches ~2.5–3 °C (4.5–5.4 °F) by 2100, the climate of Banjul in the year 2050 would most closely resemble the current climate of Bamako in Mali. The annual temperature would increase by 2 °C (3.6 °F), and the temperature of the warmest month by 3.3 °C (5.9 °F), while the temperature of the coldest month would actually decrease by 1.2 °C (2.2 °F). According to Climate Action Tracker, the current warming trajectory appears consistent with 2.7 °C (4.9 °F), which closely matches RCP 4.5.

== Districts ==
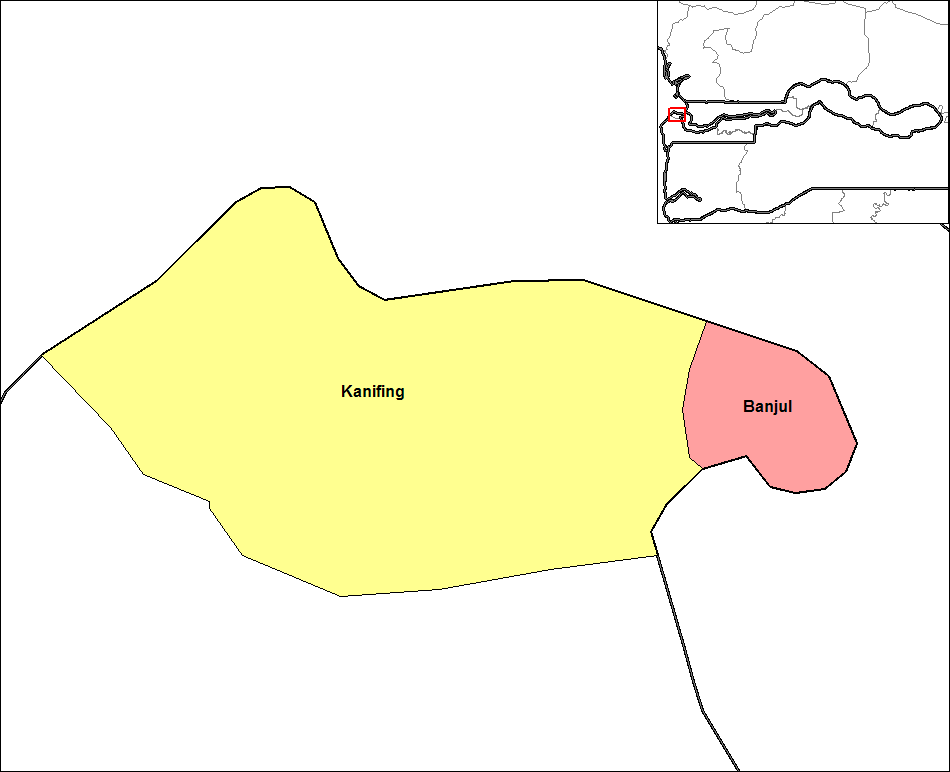
Districts of Banjul

Banjul Division (Greater Banjul Area) is divided into two districts:

- Banjul
- Kanifing

== Economy ==
Banjul is the country's economic and administrative centre and includes the Central Bank of the Gambia. Peanut processing is the country's principal industry, but beeswax, palm wood, palm oil, and skins and hides are also shipped from the port of Banjul.

Banjul is also the home of the Gambia Technical Training Institute. GTTI is engaged in a partnership with non-profit organization Power Up Gambia to develop a solar energy training program.

== Transport ==
The primary method of reaching the city by land is by road. A highway connects Banjul to Serrekunda which crosses the Denton Bridge, however ferries provide another mode of transportation. As of May 2014, ferries sail regularly from Banjul across the Gambia River to Barra. The city is served by the Banjul International Airport. Banjul is on the Trans–West African Coastal Highway connecting it to Dakar, Bissau and other cities. This project is eventually intended to provide a paved highway link to 11 other nations of the Economic Community of West African States (ECOWAS).

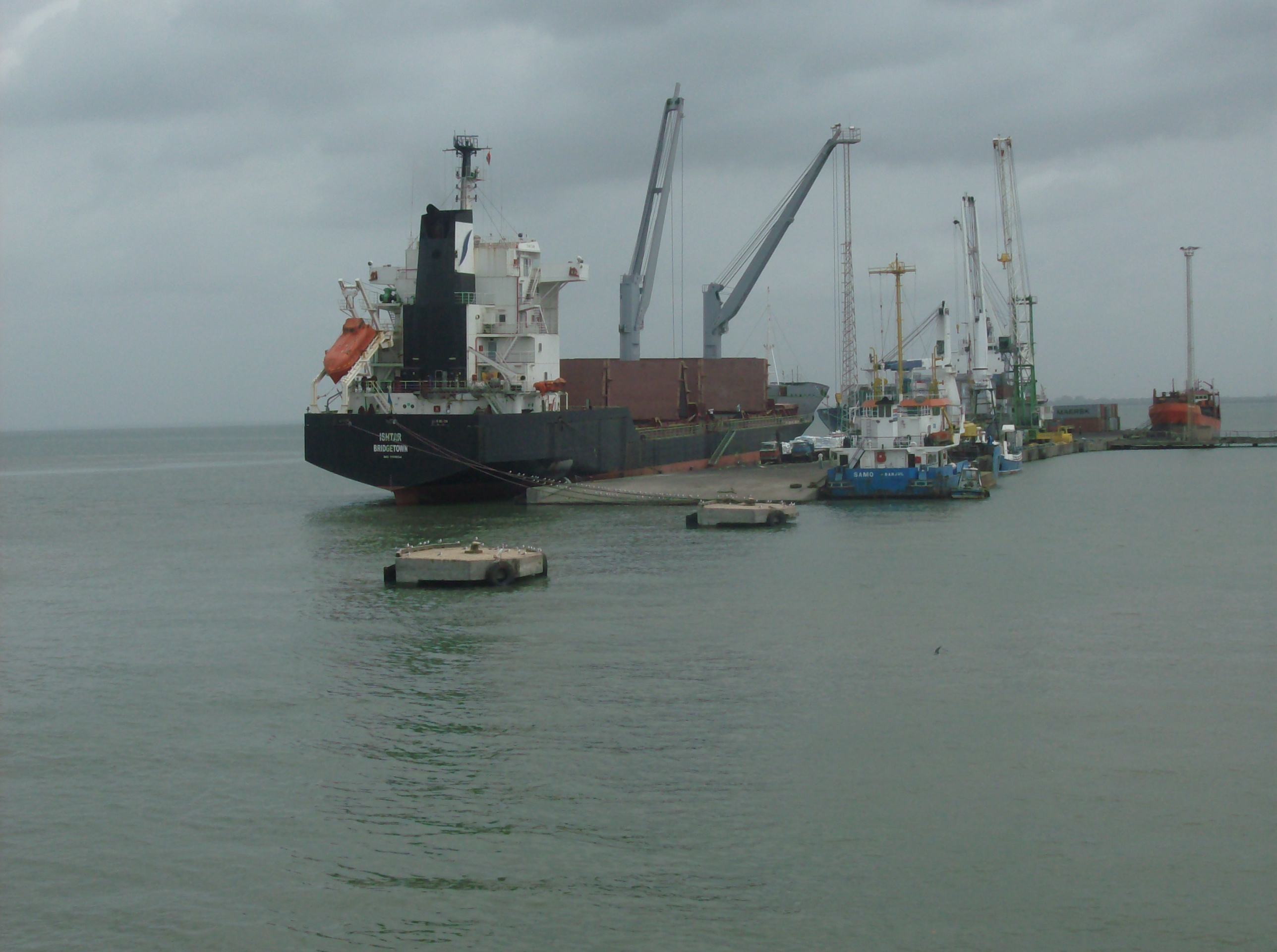
Banjul ferry

Banjul International Airport

== Culture ==
Attractions in the city include the Gambian National Museum, the Albert Market, Banjul State House, Banjul Court House, and the African Heritage Museum.

=== Sport ===
Banjul is the destination of the Plymouth-Banjul Challenge, a charity road rally.

=== Education ===
The University of the Gambia was founded in 1999. There are about five senior secondary schools in Banjul.

==== International schools ====
- Banjul American Embassy School
- École Française de Banjul in Bakau
- Maarif International School (Greater Banjul Area)
- Marina International School (Greater Banjul Area)
- SBEC International School (Greater Banjul Area)
- British International School The Gambia (Greater Banjul Area)

=== Places of worship ===
The places of worship are predominantly Muslim mosques. There are also Christian churches and congregations: Roman Catholic Diocese of Banjul (Catholic Church), Church of the Province of West Africa (Anglican Communion), Assemblies of God.

King Fahad Mosque is the largest mosque in Banjul.

== Notable people ==
- Alhaji Alieu Ebrima Cham Joof (1924—2011), historian, author, broadcaster, Pan-Africanist, anti colonial nationalist, and statesman.
- Gambino Akuboy (born 1985), singer & songwriter, actor and screenwriter
- Modou Badjie (born 1997), footballer
- Musa Barrow, footballer
- Ebrima Darboe (born 2001), football player
- Ibrahim Muhammadu Garba-Jahumpa (1912-1994), trade union leader and politician
- Nicolas Jackson, footballer
- David Jeng (born 1992), entrepreneur

== See also ==
- Divisions of the Gambia
- Districts of the Gambia

== Bibliography ==
- Pierre Gomez; Hassoum Ceesay, eds. (2018). A Geocritical Representation of Banjul (Bathurst): 1816–2016. Global Hands Publishing.
- Matthew James Park, Heart of Banjul: The History of Banjul, The Gambia, 1816-1965. PhD dissertation, Michigan State University, 2016.
- Paul Tiyambe Zeleza; Dickson Eyoh, eds. (2003). "Banjul, Gambia". Encyclopedia of Twentieth-Century African History. Routledge. ISBN 0415234794.
