= Education in the Gambia =

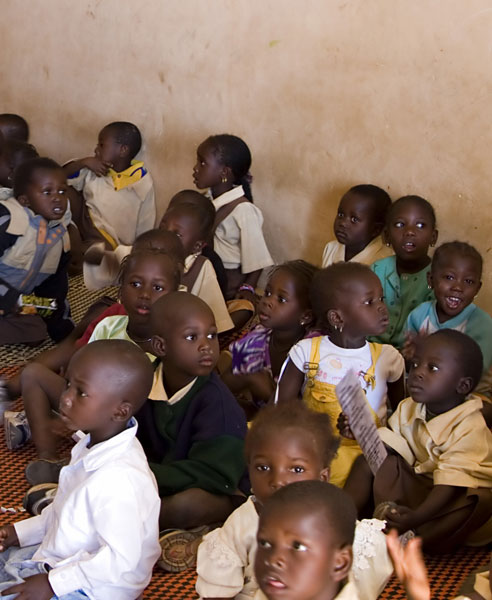
Young children in school in the Gambia

The Constitution mandates free and compulsory primary education in the Gambia, but a lack of resources and education infrastructure has made implementation difficult. In 1995, the gross primary enrollment rate was 77.1 percent and the net primary enrollment rate was 64.7 percent. School fees long prevented many children from attending school, but in February 1998 the president of the Gambia ordered the termination of fees for the first six years of schooling. Girls make up about 40 percent of primary school students, though the figure is much lower in rural areas where cultural factors and poverty prevent parents from sending girls to school. Approximately 20 percent of school-age children attend Koranic schools, which usually have a restricted curriculum.

In 1988, the government of the Gambia began a major education initiative which included a 15-year plan that has emphasized increasing gross enrollment rates, lowering school entry age from 8 to 7, developing basic education curricula, and improving teacher training.

Many of these goals have been met. The gross primary enrollment rate increased from 62.2 to 77.1 percent from 1989 to 1995; the entry age was lowered to seven years; more textbooks were made available for students; and 1,200 unqualified teachers in the system received training. The major goal the Gambia has set for itself for the remainder of the plan is to enroll 90 percent of children in schools for the full cycle of basic education by 2005. Over the 1990s, spending on education increased from 15 to 21 percent of government expenditure and 2.6 percent to 4.3 percent of GNP, while the share of the education budget devoted to primary education increased from 38 percent to 45 percent.

== School system ==
The school-going age in the Gambia is officially seven years. The education system, which is largely based on the British system, consists of the following:

- Six years of primary schooling: grades 1–6
- Three years of junior secondary schooling: grades 7–9
- Three years of senior secondary schooling: grades 10–12
- Four years of university education

=== Examinations ===
At the end of grades 6 and 9, there are selection examinations to proceed to the next level.

At the end of grade 9 people have the option to go into the skills centres which provide pre-vocational training. At the end of grade 12, depending on their performance in the West African Senior School Certificate Examination (WASSCE), students have the option to go into the Technical Training Institute, which provide vocational and technical education; go into Gambia College which provide pre-service training for teachers, nurses, public health officers and agricultural supervisors; or they can go to university or join the labour force.

== Statistics ==
In 2002/2003 total enrolment at primary schools included 79 percent of children in the relevant age-group (boys 79 percent; girls 78 percent), according to UNESCO estimates, while secondary enrollment included only 33 percent of the appropriate age-group (boys 39 percent; girls 27 percent).

According to Education Statistics from the Ministry of Basic and Secondary Education (MoBSE), the primary school completion rate in 2023 was at 80% for boys and 96% for girls.

== Literacy rate ==
The literacy rate in the Gambia is 63.9% for males and 47.6% for females. In the Gambia, 67% of children aged 3-4 are developmentally on track according to the Early Childhood Development Index. A greater percentage of girls are developmentally on track compared to boys (69% versus 65%).

== University of the Gambia ==
The University of the Gambia is a fairly new institution established by an Act of the National Assembly of the Gambia in March 1999. It comprises four faculties and Gambia College, including four schools: Agriculture, Science, Education, Nursing and Midwifery and Public Health.
