= List of villages in the Gambia =

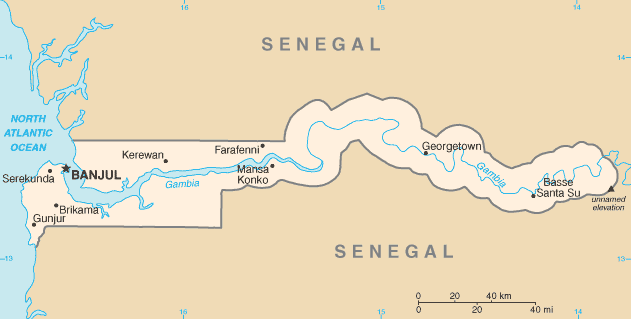
Map of The Gambia

This is a list of villages in The Gambia. A village is a clustered human settlement or community, larger than a hamlet but smaller than a town or a city, with a population ranging from a few hundred to a few thousand.

== A ==
- Albreda
- Aljamdu
- Allunhari
- Allunhari Abdou
- Amdalai

Top of page

== B ==
- Badarri
- Baja Kunda
- Bakadaji
- Bakindick Mandinka
- Bambali
- Bani
- Banjulunding
- Banni
- Bantango Koto
- Bantanto
- Bantunding
- Banyakang
- Barajally
- Baro Kunda
- Barrow Kunda
- Barry Nabeh
- Basse Nding
- Batokunku
- Berefet
- Besang Dugu
- Bohum Kunda
- Boro Dampha Kunda
- Boro Kanda Kassy
- Boro Modi Bane
- Brifu
- Brikama Ba
- Brufut
- Bulok
- Busumbala
- Busura Alieu
- Bwiam

Bintang

Top of page

== C ==
- Chamoi
- Chamoi Bunda

Top of page

== D ==
- Demba Kunda
- Diabugu
- Dumbutu
- Dobo
- Daru Rilwan

Top of page

== E ==
- Essau

Top of page

== F ==
- Faraba Banta
- Fatoto
- Fattatenda

Top of page

== G ==
- Gambissara
- Garowol
- Genieri
- Ghana Town
- Gunjur

Top of page

== J ==
- Jufureh

Top of page

Jumangsarr

Jajari

== K ==
- Kaiai
- Kalagi
- Kanilai
- Karantaba Tenda
- Kartung
- Kuntaur

Top of page

== L ==
- Lamin, North Bank Division
- Lamin, Western Division

Top of page

== M–P ==
- Mansa Konko
- Nema Kunku
- Pakali Ba
- Mandinary

Top of page Marakissa

== S–Z ==
- Sankandi
- Sare Jam Gido
- Soma
- Suduwol
- Sukuta
- Sutukoba
- Tanji
- Yundum

Top of page

== T. Tambasansang ==
- List of cities in The Gambia
- Outline of the Gambia
