= Sutukoba =

Sutukoba Sutuko
- Village
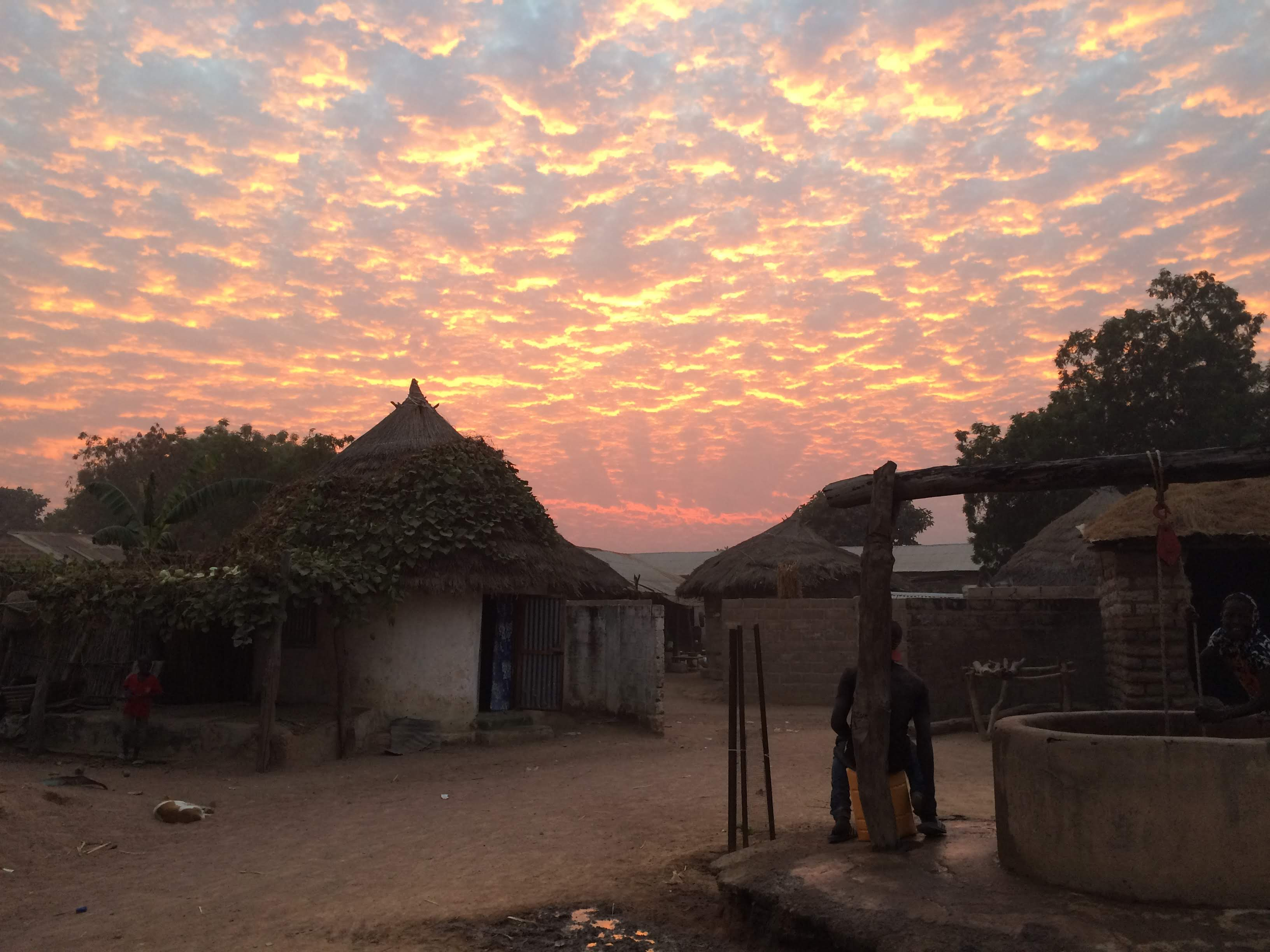

- Location in the Gambia
- Coordinates: 13°30′N 14°1′W
- Country: Gambia
- Division: Upper River Division
- District: Wuli East
- Established: Before 1450

Government
  - Alkalo: Sankung Jabai
- Elevation: 95 ft (29 m)

Population (2013)
  - Total: 3,317
  - Ethnicities: Mandinka and Jahanka
  - Religions: Islam

Sutukoba, sometimes referred to as Sutuko, is a village in The Gambia located in the Upper River Region, 332 km east of the capital Banjul and 38 km northeast of the regional capital Basse Santa Su. The population in 2013 was 3317.

== Climate ==
The surroundings of Sutukoba are a mosaic of farmland and natural vegetation. Average annual temperature is 26 °C . The warmest month is April, when the average temperature is 33 °C, and the coldest is August, with 22 °C. Average annual rainfall is 984 millimeters. The wettest month is September, with an average of 321 mm of rainfall, and the driest is February, with 1 mm of rainfall.

== Founding ==
According to local legend Sutukoba was founded by a group of hunters from Mali led by Hamang Kareh Jabbai. One day, while they were sleeping under a big tree, Hamang overheard one of the dogs telling the other dogs that humans think they are knowledgeable and know everything, but they don’t know that any village built behind the forest would be blessed. Hamang woke his men and told them they should return to Mali and bring their families to establish this blessed village behind the forest. When they did so, Hamang became the first Alkali of the village, naming it 'Sutuko' meaning 'behind the forest.' The Jabbai family gives credit to the Dansos, a jula trading family, for showing them the location.

Another oral history passed down by the Jakhanke Jabi clan, a prominent family in Sutuko, claim that the town was founded by the family's progenitor Imam Shuaybu, a companion of Al-Hajj Salim Suwari.

== History ==
Sutukoba is the oldest village in southern Wuli, and was the preeminent commercial and religious center on the upper Gambia at least as early as the 15th century. Located at the intersection of trade routes leading up the Sandugu Bolong, east-west along the Gambia towards Bundu and the Niger River, and southeast through Tanda to the Futa Djallon, it was a center of Jula settlement by the early 16th century.

Diogo Gomes may have reached Sutuko in 1456 when he sailed up the river as far as Kantora. Duarte Pacheco Pereira, writing in 1506, describes it as a major fortified town of Cantor (Kantora) with 4000 inhabitants and a key hub of a thriving gold trade:

At Sutucoo is held a great fair, to which the Mandinguas bring many asses; these same Mandinguas, when the country is at peace and there are no wars, come to our ships (which at the bidding of our prince visit these parts) and buy common red, blue and green cloth, kerchiefs, thin coloured silk, brass bracelets, caps, hats, the stones called " alaquequas " and much more merchandise, so that in time of peace, as we have said, five and six thousand doubloons of good gold are brought thence to Portugal. Sutucoo and these other towns belong to the kingdom of Jalofo, but being on the frontier of Mandingua they speak the language of Mandingua.

Later European traders André Álvares de Almada (in 1595) and Richard Jobson (in 1621) visited and wrote about Sutuco. By this time a part of the Kingdom of Wuli, the town was one of the most important religious centers in the region. It remains to the present day the seat of a prominent marabout and a center of Islamic learning in Senegambia. A yearly 'gamo' commemorates a particularly well known semi-legendary marabout named Fatty Fing, buried just east of the village.

For centuries Sutuko was the principal destination for caravans carrying gold and slaves west from Bambuk and the Mande heartland and returning east with salt from the coast. Local jula merchants as well as Europeans would travel up the river to exchange manufactures, salt, cloth, leather, ivory, gold, wax, and other goods, as well as slaves, in Sutuko and at its river port of Fattatenda.

Settlers from Sutukoba established the village of Sutukonding, meaning 'little Sutuko', just north of Basse. This village is also sometimes referred to simply as Sutuko.

The first school built in the Wuli District by the British colonial administration was in Sutukoba in 1960.

Since 2018 Sutukoba has hosted an annual Kankiling Festival to celebrate and preserve the community's history and culture.

== People ==
- Sidia Jatta, chairperson and founder of the People's Democratic Organization for Independence and Socialism
- Musa Yaffa, international football player

== Gallery ==
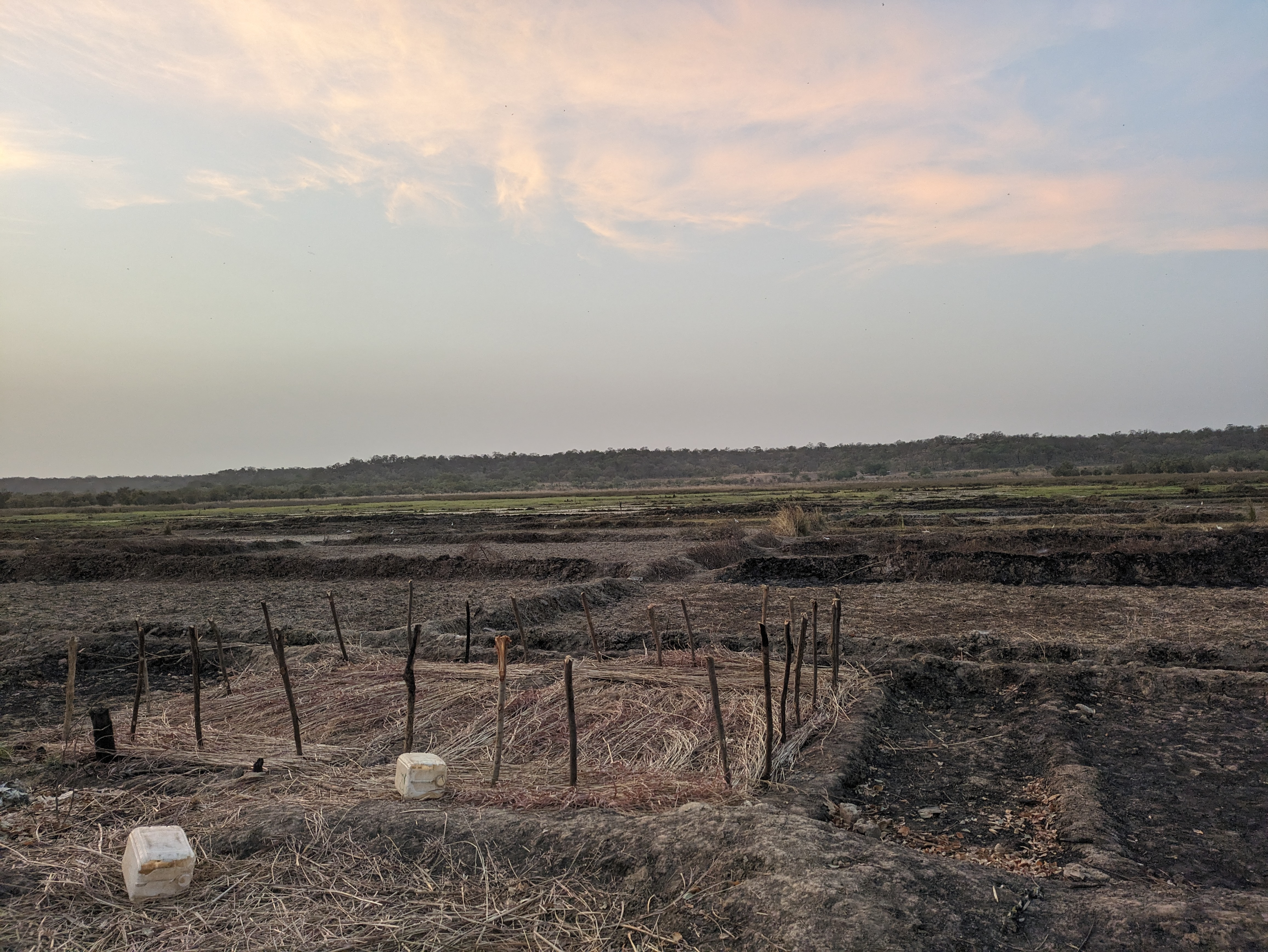
Rice fields along the Gambia river near Sutukoba

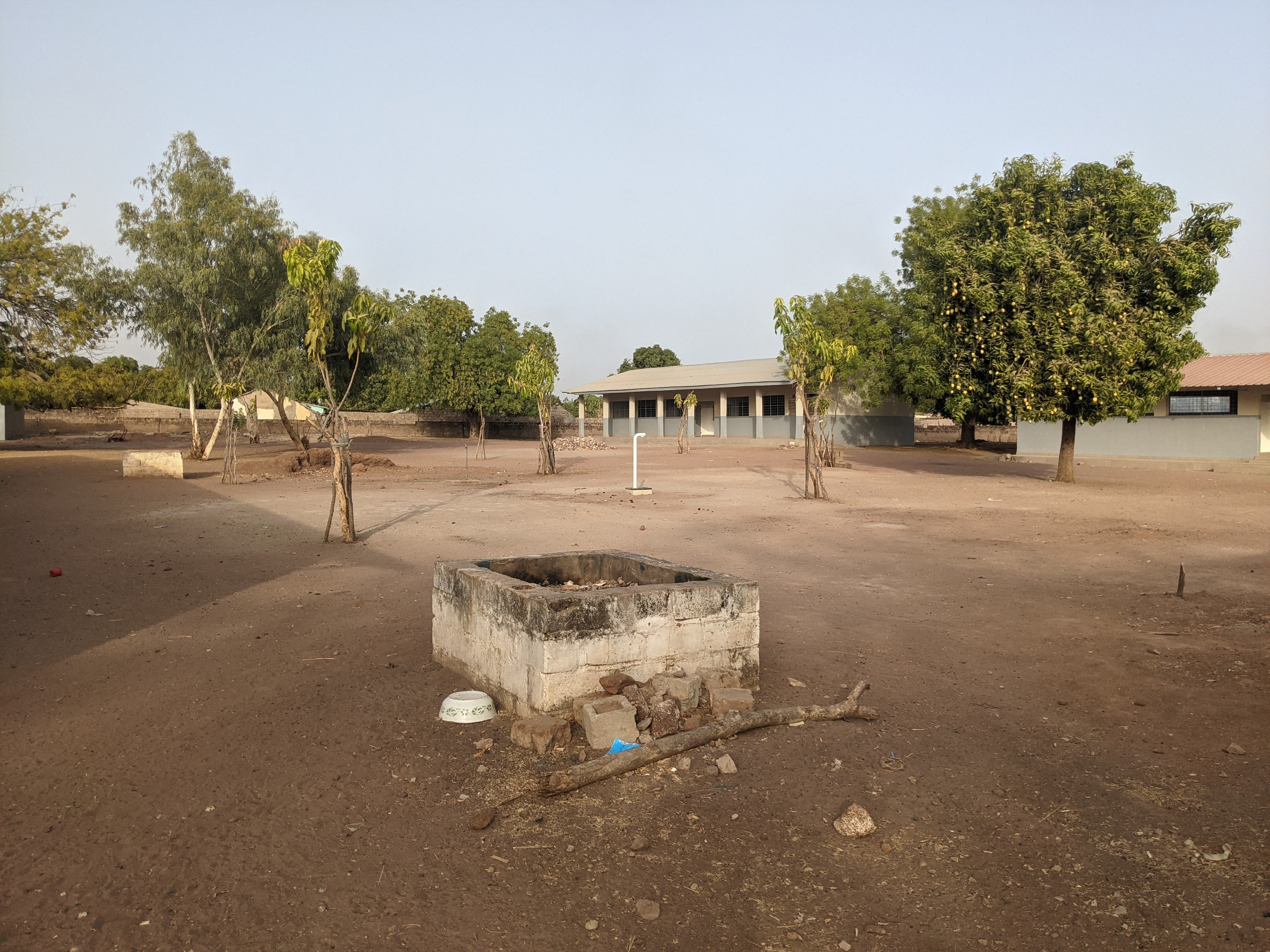
Sutukoba lower basic school

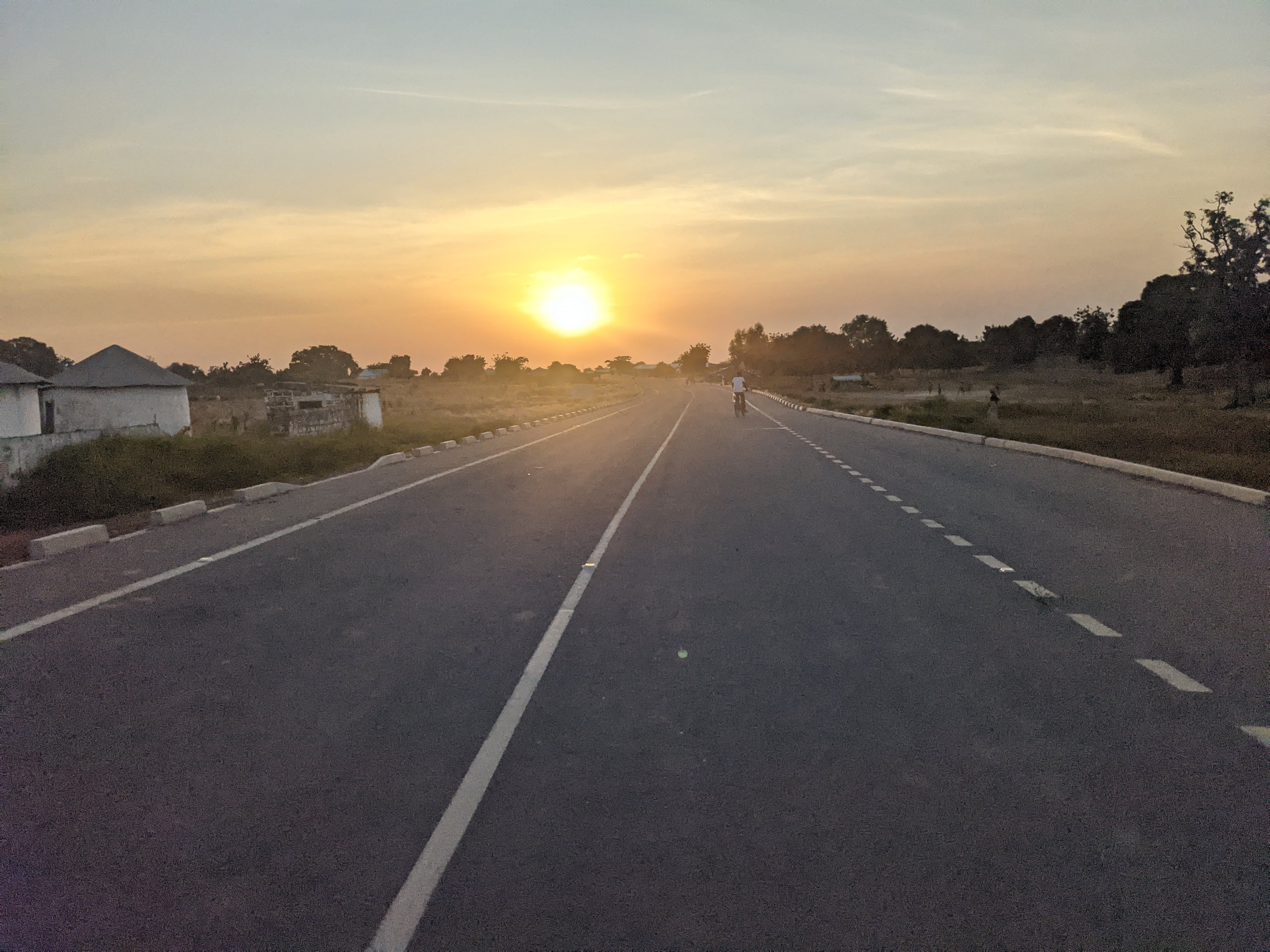
North Bank highway in Sutukoba

== See also ==
- List of villages in The Gambia
