= List of cities in the Gambia =

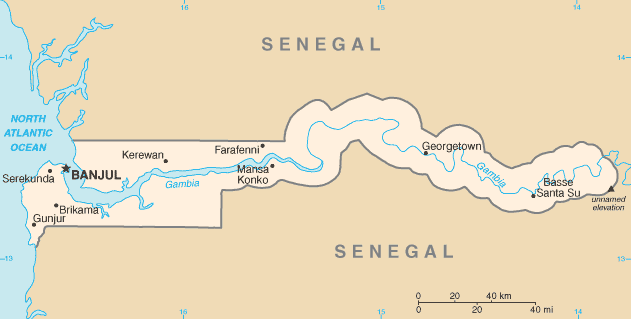
Map of the Gambia

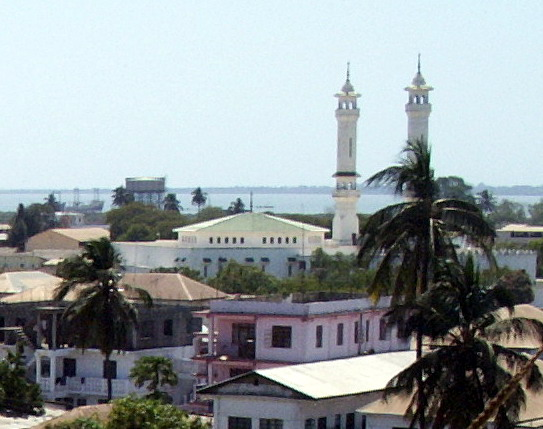
Banjul, Capital of Gambia

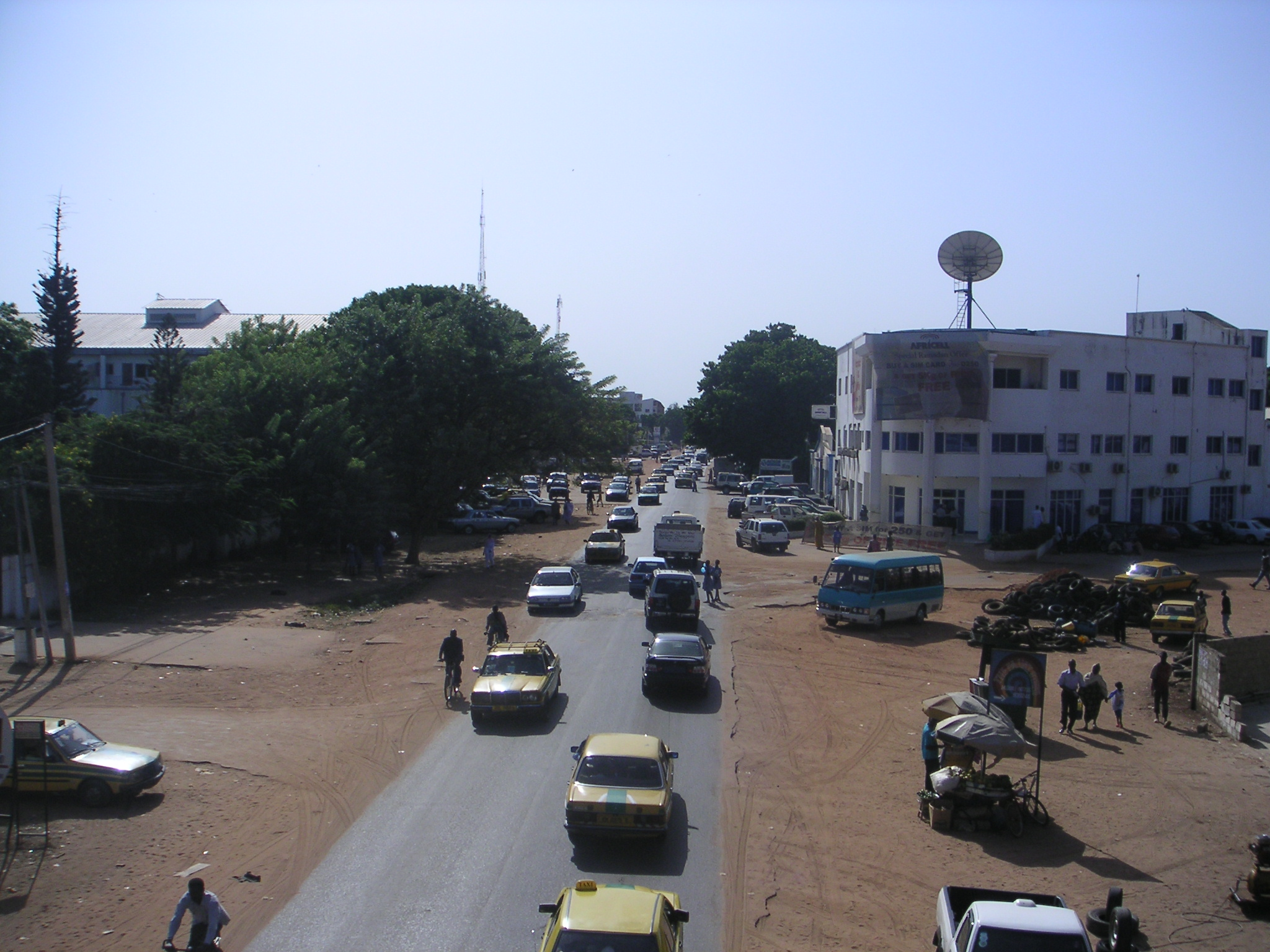
Serekunda City Centre

This is a list of cities and major towns in the Gambia.

- Abuko
- Bakau
- Banjul
- Banjulunding
- Bansang
- Basse Santa Su
- Bijilo
- Brikama
- Brufut
- Bundung
- Busumbala
- Dippa Kunda
- Farafenni
- Farato (West Coast)
- Gimara Bakadaji
- Gunjur
- Janjanbureh (Georgetown)
- Jufureh
- Kalagi
- Kanilai
- Kerewan
- Kololi
- Kotu
- Kuntaur
- Lamin (North Bank Division)
- Lamin (Western Division)
- Latri Kunda German
- Latri Kunda Sabiji
- Manjai Kunda
- Mansa Konko
- Nema Kunku
- Serekunda
- Soma
- Sukuta
- Tabokoto
- Tallinding
- Tanji
- Yundum

== See also ==
- List of villages in the Gambia
