= Sibi Kuroto Forest Park =

- IUCN category IV (habitat/species management area)
- Interactive map of Sibi Kuroto Forest Park
- Location: Upper River Division, Gambia
- Nearest city: Basse Santa Su
- Coordinates: 13°19′03″N 14°21′06″W
- Area: 174 hectares (430 acres)
- Established: January 1, 1954

Sibi Kuroto Forest Park is a forest park in the Gambia. Established on January 1, 1954, it covers 174 hectares.

It is located in the Upper River region at an altitude of six meters.
