= Kusum Forest Park =

Gambian forest park

- IUCN category IV (habitat/species management area)
- Interactive map of Kusum Forest Park
- Location: Upper River Division, Gambia
- Nearest city: Garowol
- Coordinates: 13°24′56″N 13°55′32″W
- Area: 316 ha (780 acres)
- Established: January 1, 1954

Kusum Forest Park is a forest park in the Gambia. Established on January 1, 1954, it covers 316 hectares.

It is located in the east of the country, in the Upper River Region in the Kantora district. To the west of the area is Garowol and to the east the area is bounded by the Gambia River.
