= Demba =

Demba may refer to:

== Places ==
- Demba, Democratic Republic of the Congo
- Demba Kunda
- Madina Demba Forest Park
- Stade Demba Diop

== Arts and entertainment ==
- Demba 2024 film, Senegalese drama film

== People ==
- Njogu Demba-Nyrén (born 1979), Gambian-Swedish footballer
- Demba Touré (born 1984), Senegalese footballer
- Demba Ba (born 1985), French-born Senegalese footballer
- Demba Diop (1927–1967), mayor of Mbour
- Demba Savage (born 1988), Gambian footballer
- Abdoulaye Demba (born 1976), Malian footballer
- Demba Barry (born 1987), Malian footballer
- Demba Traore (born 1982), Swedish footballer
