= Kulari =

- Interactive map of Kulari
- Coordinates: 13.40°N 14.08°W
- Country: Gambia
- Division: Upper River Division
- District: Fulladu East

Population (2013)
  - Total: 6,021

Kulari is a village in the Gambia. It is located in tumana District in the Upper River Division. As of the 2013 census, the village had a population of 6,021, up from 3,370 reported in the 2003 census. It is connected by road to Basse Santa Su.
