= Daniel Houghton =

Irish explorer (1740–1791)

Daniel Houghton (1740–1791) was an Irish explorer and one of the earliest Europeans to travel through the interior of West Africa.

== African Expedition ==
In 1790, Houghton approached the African Association in London, proposing a mission to travel up the Gambia River and explore the hinterland of Africa's west coast. His optimism, determination and apparent fearlessness worked in his favour, as did his basic knowledge of Arabic and Mandingo. His proposal was accepted by the Association. Houghton's instructions were to sail to the mouth of the Gambia, navigate the river to the Barra Kunda falls, and then to travel overland to the Hausa lands to the east. He was also tasked with pinpointing the exact location of the fabled city of Timbuktu as well as charting the course of the Niger River.

He arrived at the mouth of the Gambia River in November 1790, and visited Niumi, then moved upriver to the Kingdom of Wuli. He visited the trading post at Fattatenda and the capital of Medina Ouli. By May he had reached Boundou, but was not welcomed there, so he moved on to Farabana in Bambouk in July. He made it as far as the Kingdom of Diarra, where he was either murdered by Moors or left to die of starvation and thirst. Mungo Park later passed by the place where Houghton died on his own expedition to the Niger.

== Personal life ==
After Houghton retired from the army, he married and started a family. He married Philippa Evelyn, the great-granddaughter of John Evelyn, the diarist, at St Martin in the Fields, London, on 12 December 1783. A marriage notice referred to him as "Major of the Garrison of Goree in Africa, and formerly Consul-General to the Emperor of Morocco." They had three children: Charles Evelyn Daniel Francis Houghton, born on 20 September 1784; Frederick Hugh Evelyn Houghton, born on 30 August 1786; and Philippa Maria Houghton, born on 27 July 1788.

Prior to his marriage to Philippa Evelyn, it appears that Houghton had been previously married. In the Irish National Archives there is a file containing the "Memorial of Monica Kiernan, alias Lawler Lynch, and James, George and Cecilia Lawler Lynch of Galway Town, to Viscount Sidmouth, seeking assistance and noting that they are the descendants of the late Maj Daniel Francis Houghton, 69th Regiment of Foot, who discovered the source of the Niger River in Africa; noting that Houghton’s only child, Catherine Cornwallis Houghton, married George Lawler Lynch. Also covering letter from George Lawler Lynch, attorney, 16 George’s Place, [Dublin], seeking a situation in the law department."

== Sources ==
- Hallett, Robin, ed. (1964). Records of the African Association, 1788-1831. Edinburgh: Thomas Nelson and Sons. p. 132-133.
- Anthony Sattin, The Gates of Africa: Death, Discovery and the Search for Timbuktu, pp. 91–124 (HarperCollins, London, 2003).
- Mungo Park, Travels in the Interior Districts of Africa, Performed in the Years 1795, 1796, and 1797. with an Account of a Subsequent Mission to that Country in 1805., pp. 101–102 (John Murray, London, 1816).
- Lloyd, Ernest Marsh (1901). "Hoghton, Daniel" . In Lee, Sidney (ed.). Dictionary of National Biography (1st supplement). London: Smith, Elder & Co.
- http://www.bookrags.com/research/daniel-houghton-ued
