= Baja Kunda =

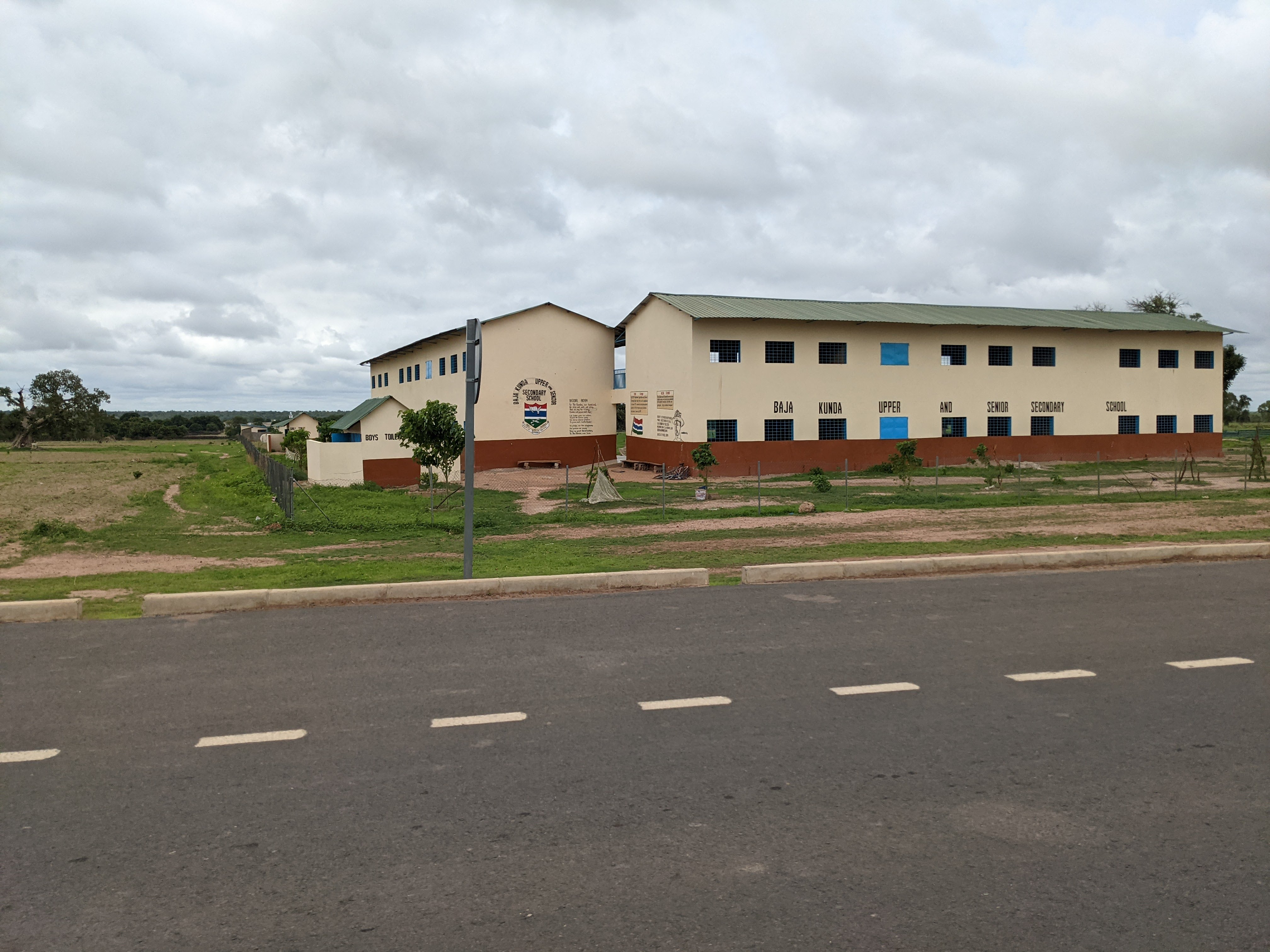
- Baja Kunda Senior Secondary School

- Location in the Gambia
- Coordinates: 13°28′N 14°3′W
- Country: Gambia
- Division: Upper River Division
- District: Wuli

Population (2016)
  - Total: 7,924
  - Ethnicities: Serahule
  - Religions: Islam

Baja Kunda is a town in eastern Gambia. It is located in Wuli East District in the Upper River Division. As of 2008, it has an estimated population of 5,924. Located just south of the north bank highway, Baja Kunda boasts an elementary, secondary, and senior secondary school as well as the main health center in the Wuli East district.

Baja Kunda was originally founded by Sarahule immigrant warriors, likely in the early 19th century. The Mansa of the Kingdom of Wuli asked them to leave, however, for fear that the noble newcomers, accustomed to being rulers, would take advantage of the proximity of European traders in Fattatenda to purchase weapons and seize power for themselves.
