= Hela Kunda Forest Park =

- IUCN category IV (habitat/species management area)
- Interactive map of Hela Kunda Forest Park
- Location: Upper River Division Gambia
- Nearest city: Basse Santa Su
- Coordinates: 13°17′50″N 14°20′12″W
- Area: 101 ha (250 acres)
- Established: January 1, 1954

Hela Kunda Forest Park is a forest park in the Gambia. Established on January 1, 1954, it covers 101 hectares.

The estimate terrain elevation above sea level is 17 metres.
