= Wuli =

Wuli may refer to:

- Wuli District, a district in the Upper River Division of the Gambia
- The Kingdom of Wuli, a former kingdom in Senegambia, after which the district was named

== China ==
- Wuli railway station, station on the Qinghai–Tibet Railway

Towns

- Wuli, Lingshan County (武利镇), Guangxi

Written as "五里镇":

- Wuli, Guigang, in Gangnan District, Guigang, Guangxi
- Wuli, Xinyang, in Pingqiao District, Xinyang, Henan
- Wuli, Tongcheng County, in Tongcheng County, Hubei
- Wuli, Huai'an, in Huaiyin District, Huai'an, Jiangsu
- Wuli, Ankang, in Hanbin District, Ankang, Shaanxi
- Wuli, Yijun County, in Yijun County, Shaanxi

Community

- Wuli, Wulipu, Shayang, Jingmen, Hubei

== Science ==
- Wuli (journal), a journal of physics published by the Chinese Physical Society
