= Jundala Forest Park =

Forest park in the Gambia

- IUCN category IV (habitat/species management area)
- Interactive map of Jundala Forest Park
- Location: Upper River Division Gambia
- Nearest city: Garawol
- Coordinates: 13°22′19″N 13°49′7″W
- Area: 437 ha (1,080 acres)
- Established: January 1, 1954

Jundala Forest Park is a forest park in the Gambia. Established on January 1, 1954, it covers 437 hectares.

It has an elevation of 54 metres. The Park is situated east of Sun Kunda.
