= Boro Dampha Kunda =

Coordinates: 13.414462°N 14.019569°W

- Interactive map of Boro Dampha Kunda
- Country: The Gambia
- Division: Upper River Division
- District: Wuli

Population (2009)
  - Total: 353 (est.)

Boro Dampha Kunda is a town in the Gambia. It is located in Wuli District in the Upper River Division. As of 2009, it has an estimated population of 353.
