= Bantango Koto =

Coordinates: 13°33′N 14°33′W

- Interactive map of Bantango Koto
- Country: The Gambia
- Division: Upper River Division
- District: Wuli

Population (2009)
  - Total: 327 (est.)

Bantango Koto is a village in the Gambia. It is located in Wuli District in the Upper River Division. As of 2009, it has an estimated population of 327.
