= Boro Kanda Kassy =

Boro Kanda Kasse is a village in South East of Upper River Division, The Gambia

Coordinates: 13.422096°N 14.028973°W

Boro Kanda Kasse
- Interactive map of Boro Kanda Kasse
- Country: The Gambia
- Division: Upper River Division
- District: Wuli

Population (2009)
  - Total: 1,091 (est.)

Boro Kanda Kassy is a town in the Gambia. It is located in Wuli East District in the Upper River Region. As of 2009, it has an estimated population of 1091.
