= Bantunding =

- Interactive map of Bantunding
- Coordinates: 13.47°N 14.08°W
- Country: Gambia
- Division: Upper River Division
- District: Wuli

Population (2009)
  - Total: 1,114 (est.)

Bantunding is a village in the Gambia. It is located in Wuli East District in the Upper River Division. As of 2009, it has an estimated population of 1114. Bantunding is home to several traditional rulers locally known as Seyfo. The last chief from the village is called Sergeant Madi Wally. Madi Wally’ Father Jumu Wally also served as chief.

Bantunding was established in 1890 by two branches of the Wali family, the ruling dynasty of the Kingdom of Wuli. They were attempting to ensure their power and influence in southern Wuli in light of the impending demarcation of the border between the colonies of Senegal and Gambia. They only managed to hold the chiefship of Wuli District until 1925, however.
