= Barrow Kunda =

Coordinates: 13°29′19″N 14°07′01″W

Barrow Kunda Barokunda
- Interactive map of Barrow Kunda
- Country: The Gambia
- Division: Upper River Division
- District: Wuli

Population (2009)
  - Total: 1 730 (est.)

Barrow Kunda is a town in the Gambia. It is located in Wuli District in the Upper River Division. According to tradition the village was founded in the 16th century by Alai Bah, a marabout from Futa Toro. The king of Wuli at the time, Mansa Jalali Wali convinced him to settle there by promising him autonomy to practice Islam and protection from search and seizure.

The Alkalo (village chief) is generally the head of the Barrow family. Barrow Kunda had as of 2009 an estimated population of 1 730.

There is another Barrow Kunda located in Foni Kansala district.
