= Alagie Wally =

Gambian footballer (born 2006)

Personal information
- Date of birth: 3 April 2006 (age 20)
- Place of birth: Brifu, The Gambia
- Height: 1.82 m (6 ft 0 in)
- Position: Forward

Team information
- Current team: Veres Rivne
- Number: 20

Youth career
- Hawks FC

Senior career*
Years	Team	Apps	(Gls)
2023–2025	Hawks FC	53	(31)
2025–	Veres Rivne	7	(0)

International career^{‡}
2024	The Gambia U20	4	(1)
2025–	The Gambia	2	(0)
- * Club domestic league appearances and goals as of 3 June 2026 ‡ National team caps and goals as of 00:13, 11 September 2025 (UTC)

Alagie Wally (born 3 April 2006), sometimes nicknamed Gary, is a Gambian professional footballer who plays as a forward for the Ukrainian Premier League club Veres Rivne, and The Gambia national team.

== Club career ==
Wally began his senior career with the Gambian club Hawks FC in 2023, and in his second season helped them earn promotion to the GFA League First Division. He had 31 goals and 15 assists with Hawks FC in 53 matches. On 12 July 2025, he signed a 5-year contract with the Ukrainian Premier League club Veres Rivne.

== International career ==
Wally was first called up to The Gambia national team for a set of friendlies in June 2025.
