= Boro Modi Bane =

- Interactive map of Boro Modi Bane
- Coordinates: 13.43°N 14.03°W
- Country: The Gambia
- Division: Upper River Division
- District: Wuli

Population (2009)
  - Total: 231 (est.)

Boro Modi Bane is a town in the Gambia. It is located in Wuli District in the Upper River Division. As of 2009, it has an estimated population of 231.
