= Fattatenda =

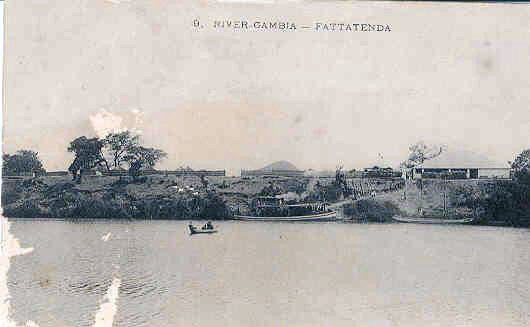
- On the Gambia River (1904)

- Location in the Gambia
- Coordinates: 13°27′N 14°4′W
- Country: Gambia
- Division: Upper River Division
- District: Wuli

Population (2009)
  - Total: 49 (est.)

Fattatenda is a small village in eastern Gambia on the Gambia River. It is located in Wuli District in the Upper River Division, a few kilometers southwest of the much larger village of Baja Kunda. As of 2009, it has an estimated population of 49.

== History ==
Fattatenda was a major trading post in the Kingdom of Wuli by 17th century, serving as the port for Sutukoba, a major transshipment point between jula overland routes and Euro-African riverine trade. It was abandoned in 1734 "on account of the bad usage received from the Natives."

In 1829, Mansa Nkoi of Wuli ceded Fattatenda to the British administrator William Hutton, but the agreement was later repudiated by the British government and Hutton was dismissed. Still, Fattatenda was the main upriver entrepot for trade on the Gambia river, exchanging cloth and guns for gold and ivory coming from Bundu to the east. It was thereby linked to the French fort and trading post of Bakel on the Senegal River and the Trans-Saharan caravan routes. The almaamy of Bundu sacked the town in 1865, destroying £7000 of British merchandise.

The ruins of commercial buildings are still visible today.
