= Banni =

- Interactive map of Banni
- Coordinates: 13.38°N 14.25°W
- Country: Gambia
- Division: Upper River Division
- District: Wuli

Population (2009)
  - Total: 658 (est.)

Banni is a village in the Gambia. It is located in Wuli District in the Upper River Division. As of 2009, it has an estimated population of 461.
