= Pakali Ba =

Human settlement in Gambia

Pakali Ba is a riverside settlement in the Gambia. It is in the Jarra East area of the Lower River Division. Pakaliba is one of the earliest settlements of Jarra East. The founder was Kering Fenye Darboe who initially settled with his elder brother Abdou Kareem Darboe (commonly referred to as Kareem Jabati) at Bureng. He was a hunter who used to travel towards the Sofainyama stream with his hunting dogs. The village is composed of four main clans called kabilo in Mandinka. These are Foday Kunda, Burang Kunda, Bantang Killing and Ceesay Kunda.

Its co-ordinates are 13°31′N 15°14′W. Pakali Ba is the last village of the Lower River Region along the Sofainyama Bolong. According to the 2013 census it has a population of more than one thousand people.
