= Brifu =

- Interactive map of Brifu
- Coordinates: 13.50°N 13.93°W
- Country: The Gambia
- Division: Upper River Division
- District: Wuli

Population (2009)
  - Total: 1,440 (est.)

Brifu is a town in the Gambia. It is located in Wuli District in the Upper River Division. As of 2009, it has an estimated population of 1,440.
