= Chamoi Bunda =

Coordinates: 13°27′50″N 14°06′53″W

- Interactive map of Chamoi Bunda
- Country: The Gambia
- Division: Upper River Division
- District: Wuli District

Population (2009)
  - Total: 785 (est.)
  - Ethnicities: Serahule
  - Religions: Islam

Chamoi Bunda is a town in the Gambia. It is located in Wuli District in the Upper River Division. As of 2009, it has an estimated population of 785.
