= Gambissara =

- Location in the Gambia
- Coordinates: 13°14′N 14°19′W
- Country: The Gambia
- Division: Upper River Division
- District: Fulladu West

Population (2009)
  - Total: 10,102 (est.)
  - Ethnicities: Sarakhule
  - Religions: Islam

Gambissara is a town in south-eastern Gambia near the border with Senegal. It is located in Fulladu West District in the Upper River Division. As of 2009, it has an estimated population of 10,102.

A historically important village, Gambissara was founded by Bunasa Tunkara. It was split in two by the border drawn as a result of the Anglo-French Convention of 1889. The French side subsequently emptied as the villagers fled more onerous tax and forced labor demands there.

Gambissara Forest Park is located nearby.
