= Musa Yaffa =

Gambian footballer

Personal information
- Date of birth: 15 July 1994 (age 32)
- Place of birth: Sutukoba, Gambia
- Height: 1.98 m (6 ft 6 in)
- Position: Defender

Team information
- Current team: Banjul Hawks

Senior career*
Years	Team	Apps	(Gls)
2013–2015	Bakau United		
2015–	Banjul Hawks		

International career^{‡}
2016–	Gambia	4	(0)
- * Club domestic league appearances and goals as of 12:23, 2 March 2018 (UTC) ‡ National team caps and goals as of 12:23, 2 March 2018 (UTC)

Musa Yaffa (born 15 July 1994) is a Gambian international footballer who plays for Banjul Hawks, as a defender.

== Career ==
Born in Sutukoba, he has played club football for Bakau United and Banjul Hawks.

He made his international debut for Gambia in 2016.
