= Besang Dugu =

- Country: The Gambia
- Division: Upper River Division
- District: Fulladu East

Population (2009)
  - Total: 559 (est.)

Besang Dugu is a town in the Gambia. It is located in Fulladu East District in the Upper River Division. As of 2009, it has an estimated population of 559.
