= Gambissara Forest Park =

National park in Gambia

- IUCN category IV (habitat/species management area)
- Interactive map of Gambissara Forest Park
- Location: Upper River Division Gambia
- Nearest city: Gambissara
- Coordinates: 13°15′2″N 14°17′16″W
- Area: 308 ha (760 acres)
- Established: January 1, 1954

Gambissara Forest Park is a forest park in the Gambia. Established on January 1, 1954, it covers 308 hectares.

Gambissara Forest Park is 38 meters above sea level.
