= Tijan Jaiteh =

Gambian footballer

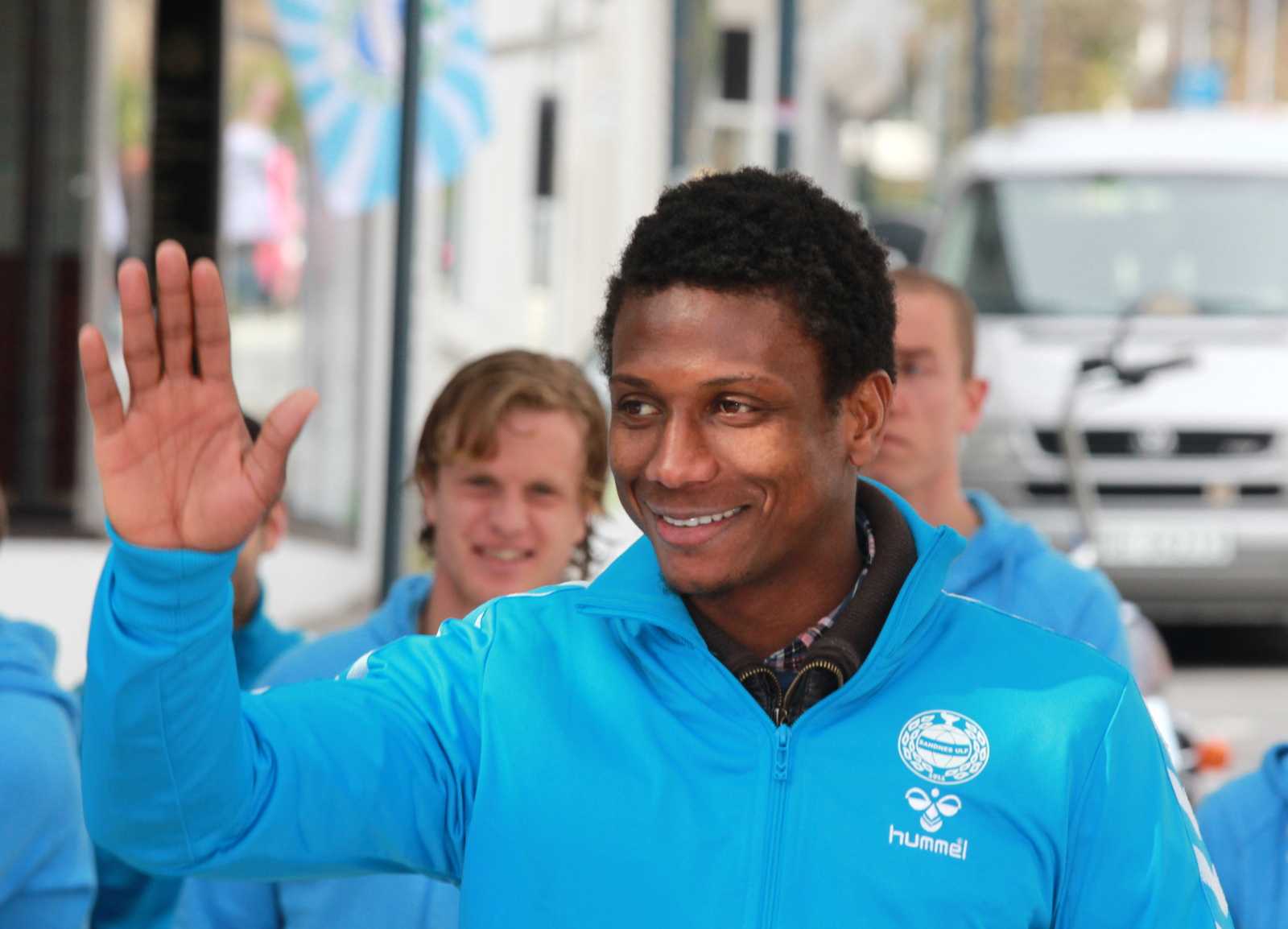

Personal information
- Full name: Tijan Jaiteh
- Date of birth: 31 December 1988 (age 37)
- Place of birth: Bwiam, Gambia
- Height: 1.88 m (6 ft 2 in)
- Position: Defensive midfielder

Youth career
- Gambia Ports Authority

Senior career*
Years	Team	Apps	(Gls)
2007–2012	Brann	68	(2)
2011	→ Randers (loan)	13	(0)
2012–2013	Sandefjord	52	(3)
2014	Sandnes Ulf	24	(0)
2015	Koper	2	(0)
2016	KuPS	26	(1)
2016–2017	Bnei Yehuda	12	(0)
2017–2018	Al-Markhiya	17	(0)
2019–2020	Partizani Tirana	3	(0)

International career
- Gambia U17
- Gambia U20
2007–2018	Gambia	20	(1)
- * Club domestic league appearances and goals

Tijan Jaiteh (born 31 December 1988) is a Gambian former footballer.

He was captain of Gambia's international youth team for a number of years. And is currently the captain of the senior national team Appointed as good will ambassador of The Gambia Tijan Jaiteh is accorded full diplomatic status.

Tijan runs the Tijan Jaiteh Football Academy he founded in collaboration with FK Bodø-Glimt

== Club career ==
In 2005, Jaiteh, along with three of his countrymen, came to Bergen on a trial for the Norwegian Premier League club SK Brann. The club secured exclusive rights to buy all four of the young Gambians. In October 2006 it became clear that only Jaiteh passed the bar, and he joined SK Brann in January 2007. He won the Norwegian Premier League with Brann the same year.

31 January 2011 he was loaned out to Randers until the end of 2011, but he had his loan cut short after disappearing from the club in August.

On 18 March 2012 he signed a one-year contract with Sandefjord. On 5 February 2019 it was confirmed, that Jaiteh had signed a one-year contract with FK Partizani Tirana.

== International ==
Jaiteh competed in the 2007 African Youth Championship where Gambia finished third and got qualified for the 2007 FIFA U-20 World Cup. Jaiteh was part of Gambian U-20 team at both tournaments, and Gambia ended knocked out by Austria in the Round of 16 at U-20 World cup.
