= Medina Ouli =

- Village
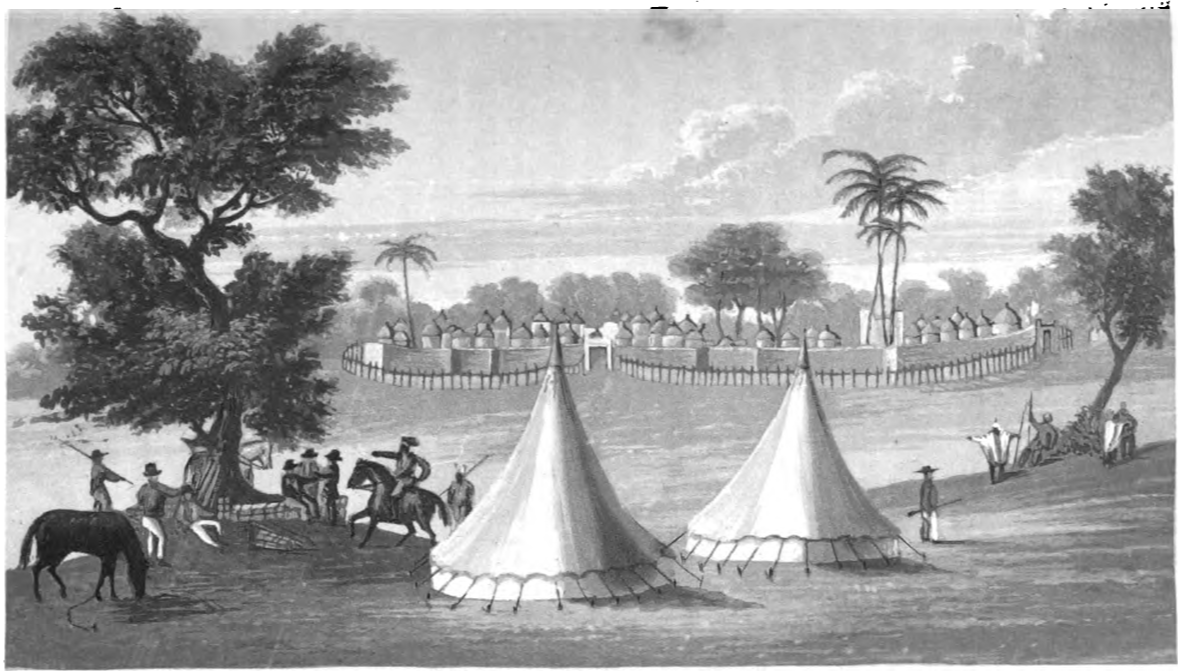
- Medina Ouli in 1818

- Location within Senegal
- Coordinates (region:SN_type:city): 13°40′35″N 14°06′33″W
- Country: Senegal
- Region: Tambacounda Region
- Departement: Tambacounda
- Time zone: UTC+0 (GMT)

Medina Ouli or Medina Wouly is a village in the Makacolibantang Arrondissement of Senegal. It was the capital of the Kingdom of Wuli from the mid-16th century until 1875.

== History ==
Kope Wali, a prince of Wuli, was driven into exile by his brothers after his father's death in the middly of the 16th century. He eventually returned, founded a new capital at Medina, and defeated his brothers to take the title of Wulimansa. Medina was the seat of the kings of Wuli for the next 300 years.

In March 1791, while the Irish explorer Daniel Houghton was staying at the Mansa's court, the town was destroyed by a massive fire. At the time it held around 1000 homes.

Medina was sacked by the Kingdom of Jolof in 1875. The major royal lineages each left the ruined town and settled elsewhere, destroying the unity of the state.

== Sources ==
- Galloway, Winifred (1975). A History of Wuli from the Thirteenth to the Nineteenth Century (History PhD). University of Indiana.
- Weil, Peter (1984). "Slavery, groundnuts, and European capitalism in the Wuli Kingdom of Senegambia, 1820–1930". Research in Economic Anthropology: 77–119.
