= Brikama Ba =

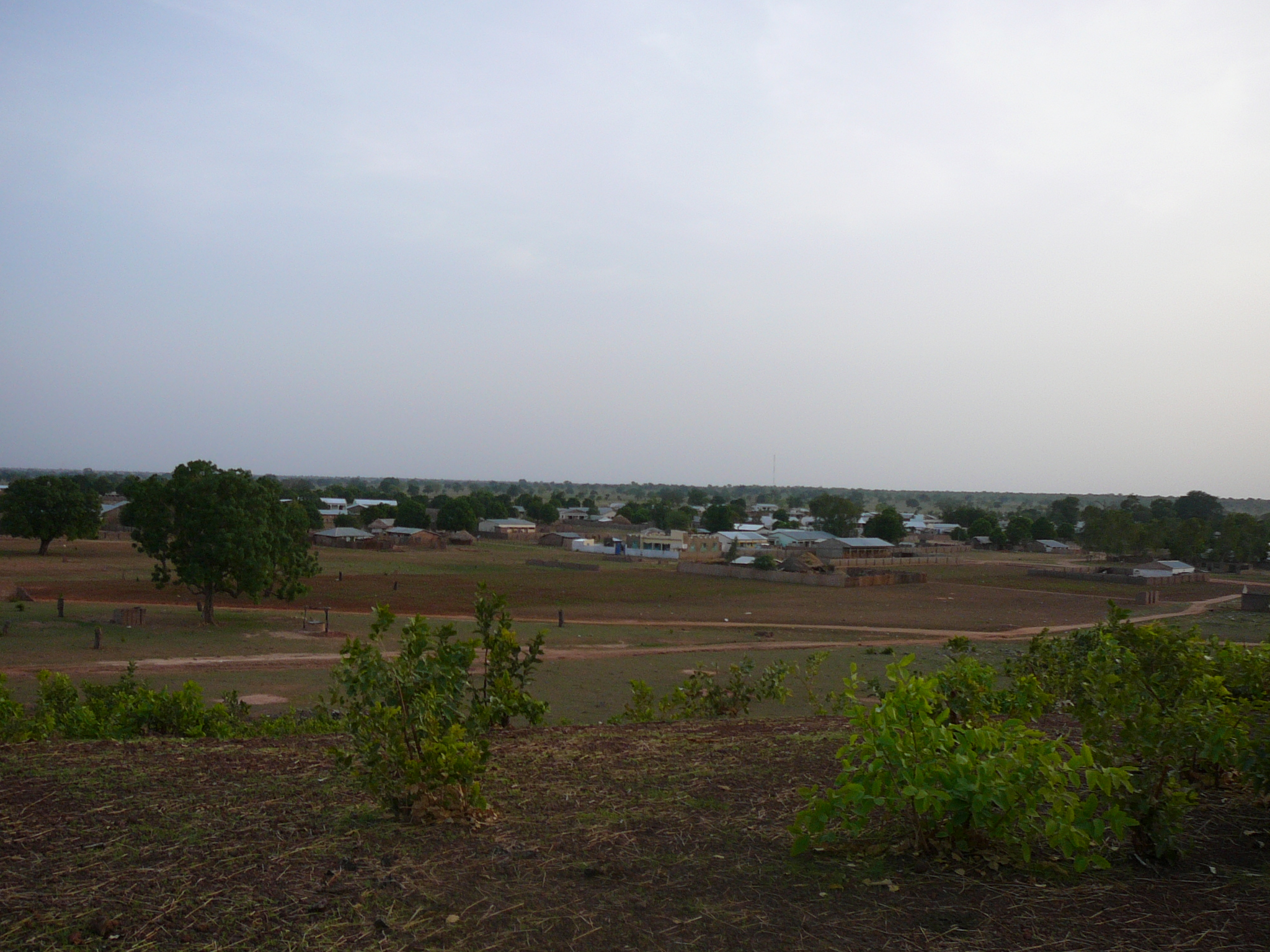

- Location in the Gambia
- Coordinates: 13°32′N 14°56′W
- Country: Gambia
- Division: Central River Division
- District: Fulladu West

Population
  - Estimate (2022): 10,343

Brikama Ba is a small town in the Fulladu East District, Central River Division, The Gambia. As of 2022, it has an estimated population of 10,343.

The Kaolang Forest Park is located nearby.
