= Barry Nabeh =

- Interactive map of Barry Nabeh
- Coordinates: 13.45°N 14.38°W
- Country: The Gambia
- Division: Upper River Division
- District: Sandu

Population (2009)
  - Total: 171 (est.)

Barry Nabeh is a town in the Gambia. It is located in Sandu District in the Upper River Division. As of 2009, it has an estimated population of 171.
