= Fulladu East =

District of the Upper River Division, the Gambia

Coordinates: 13°20′N 14°15′W

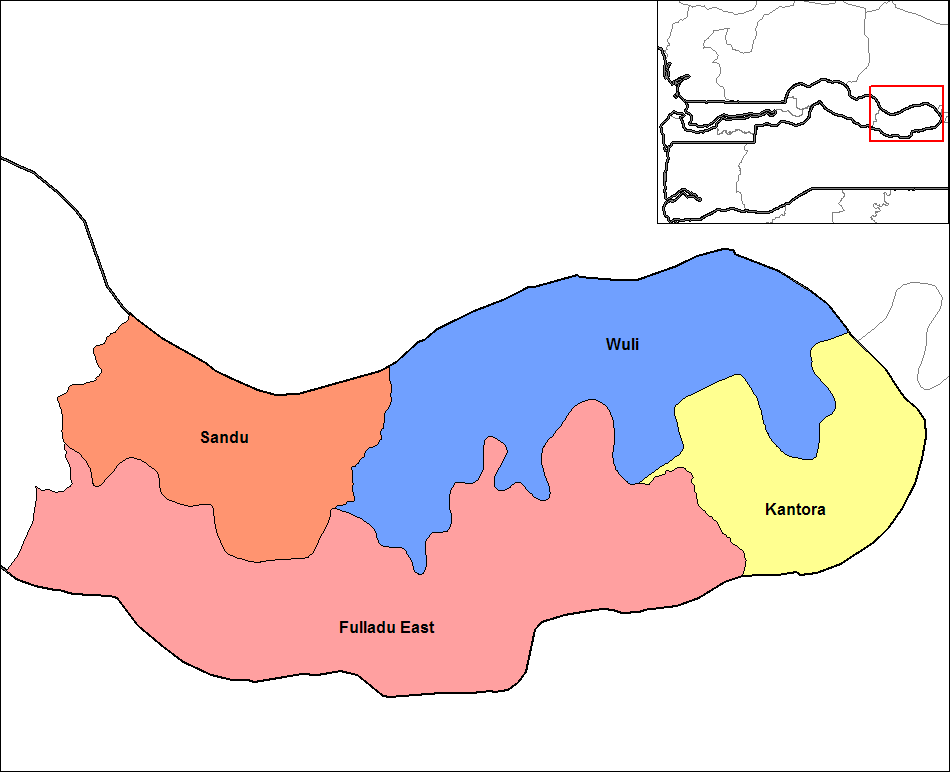
Districts of Upper River Division

Fulladu East was one of the four districts of the Upper River Division of the Gambia. The Upper River Division is now the Basse Local Government Area, and the former Fulladu East District is now divided into a Basse Fulladu East District, a Jimara District and a Tumana District.

Fulladu East contains a number of towns including Allunhari, Allunhari Abdou, Badarri, Bakadaji, Basse Nding, Basse Santa Su, Berefet, Besang Dugu, Bohum Kunda, Busura Alieu, Chamoi, Chamoi Bunda, Demba Kunda and Kulari. Its population in the 2013 census was 49,990.
