= Baro Kunda =

- Location in the Gambia
- Coordinates: 13°29′N 15°16′W
- Country: Gambia
- Division: Lower River Division
- District: Jarra East

Population (2012)
  - Total: 2,149

Baro Kunda is a town in central-southern Gambia. It is located in Jarra East District in the Lower River Division. As of 2012, it has an estimated population of 2,149.
