= Allunhari Abdou =

- Interactive map of Allunhari Abdou
- Coordinates: 13.31673°N 14.24914°W
- Country: The Gambia
- Division: Upper River Division
- District: Fulladu East

Population (2009)
  - Total: 414 (est.)

Allunhari Abdou is a village in the Gambia. It is located in Niani District in the Upper River Division. As of 2009, it has an estimated population of 414.
