= Berefet =

- Location in the Gambia
- Coordinates: 13.243246°N 16.380244°W
- Country: The Gambia
- Division: Upper River Division
- District: Fulladu East

Population (2009)
  - Total: 313 (est.)

Berefet is a town in the Gambia. It is located in Fulladu East District in the Upper River Division. As of 2009, it has an estimated population of 313.
