= Chamoi =

Coordinates: 13°19′08″N 14°09′53″W

- Interactive map of Chamoi
- Country: The Gambia
- Division: Upper River Division
- District: Fulladu East

Population (2009)
  - Total: 197 (est.)

Chamoi is a town in the Gambia. It is located in Fulladu East District in the Upper River Division. As of 2009, it has an estimated population of 197.
