= Bwiam =

- Village
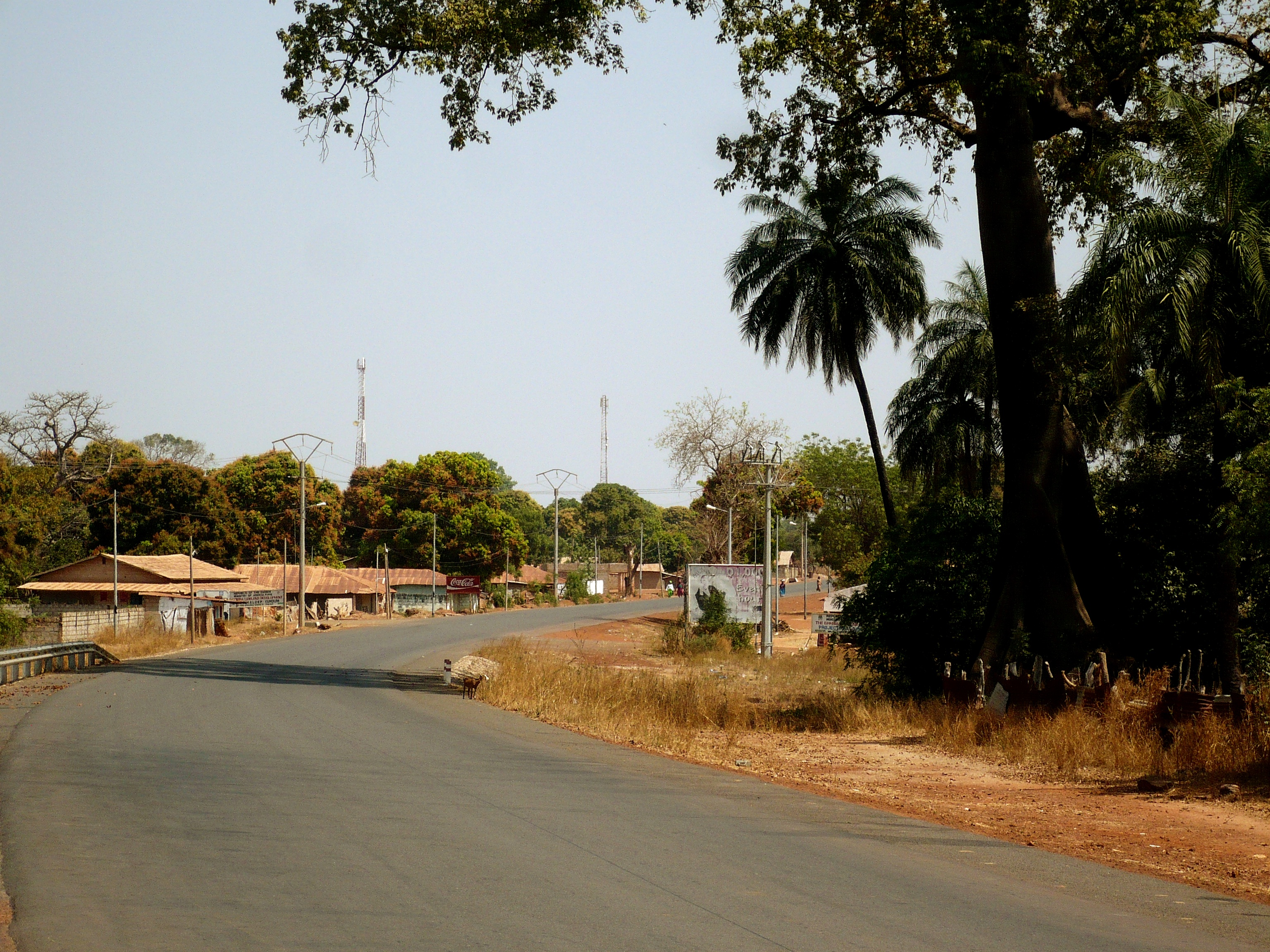
- The village of Bwiam

- Location in The Gambia
- Coordinates: 13°13′44″N 16°04′48″W
- Country: The Gambia
- Division: West Coast Region
- District: Foni Kansala
- Elevation: 65 ft (20 m)

Population (2009)
  - Total: 3,834 (est.)
- Time zone: UTC+00:00 (GMT)

Bwiam, or Bwiam-Kankuntu, is a small village in southwestern Gambia. It is located in Foni Kansala District in the Western Division. As of 2009, it has an estimated population of 3,834.

== Notable people ==
- Sainey Nyassi (born 31 January 1989) - Footballer
- Sanna Nyassi (born 31 January 1989) - Footballer
- Tijan Jaiteh (born 31 December 1988) - Footballer
- Sulayman Badjie (born 8 August 1969) - Former Commander of the Republican National Guard under Yahya Jammeh.

== Culture and Sights ==
Near catholic Fatima secondary school is a local sight called Bwiam cooking pot, a big cast iron pot, believed to have been here for more than a hundred years. Between Bwiam und Bondali is a holy / sacred tree as place of worship known under the name of Kanjendi.
