= Badarri =

- Interactive map of Badarri
- Coordinates: 13.33°N 14.10°W
- Country: Gambia
- Division: Upper River Division
- District: Fulladu East

Population (2009)
  - Total: 658 (est.)

Badarri is a village in the Gambia. It is located in Fulladu East District in the Upper River Division. As of 2009, it has an estimated population of 658.
