= Demba Kunda =

Town in The Gambia

Demba Kunda Xase. The Gambia
- Town
- Location in the Gambia
- Coordinates: 13°15′N 14°16′W
- Country: The Gambia
- Division: Upper River Division
- District: Fulladu East
- Established: 15 March 1820

Government
  - Debigume.: Actual leader. Degumeh Camara

Population (2026)
  - Total: 5,100 (est.)
- Demba Soxona Camara

Demba Kunda Xase is a small town in south-eastern Gambia. It is located in Fulladu East District in the Upper River Division. As of 2026, it had an estimated population of 5,100

Gambissara Forest Park is located nearby.
