= Kaolang Forest Park =

Gambian national park

- IUCN category IV (habitat/species management area)
- Location within The Gambia
- Location: Central River Division Gambia
- Nearest city: Brikama Ba
- Coordinates: 13°34′32″N 15°01′30″W
- Area: 2,379 ha (5,880 acres)
- Established: January 1, 1954

Kaolang Forest Park is a forest park in the Gambia. Established on January 1, 1954, it covers 2379 hectares.

It lies on both sides of the South Bank Road, Gambia's main trunk road, along the stretch between Soma and Brikama Ba. The Kaolang Forest Park is about twelve kilometers before Brikama Ba and eight kilometers after Kundang.
