= Bohum Kunda =

Coordinates: 13.555670°N 13.950556°W

- Interactive map of Bohum Kunda
- Country: The Gambia
- Division: Upper River Division
- District: Fulladu East

Population (2009)
  - Total: 722 (est.)

Bohum Kunda is a town in the Gambia. It is located in Fulladu East District in the Upper River Division. As of 2009, it has an estimated population of 722.
