= Kaiai =

- Location in the Gambia
- Coordinates: 13°35′N 14°52′W
- Country: The Gambia
- Division: Central River Division
- District: Niani

Population (2009)
  - Total: 816 (est.)

Kaiai is a village in central Gambia on the Gambia River. It is located in Niani District in the Central River Division. As of 2009, it has an estimated population of 816.
