= Madina Demba Forest Park =

- IUCN category IV (habitat/species management area)
- Interactive map of Madina Demba Forest Park
- Location: Central River Division Gambia
- Nearest city: Bansang
- Coordinates: 13°28′N 14°45′W
- Area: 2,373 ha (5,860 acres)
- Established: January 1, 1954

Madina Demba Forest Park is a forest park in the Gambia. Established on January 1, 1954, it covers 2373 hectares.

Madina Demba Forest Park has an elevation of 50 metres. It is situated southeast of Mban.
