= Daru Rilwan =

- Village
- Daru Rilwan
- Coordinates: 13°32′45.5″N 15°59′07.1″W
- Country: The Gambia

Area
  - Total: 0.42 km^{2} (0.16 sq mi)
- Elevation: 37 m (121 ft)

Population
  - Total: 1,045

Daru Rilwan is a small village located in North Bank, The Gambia, a country in West Africa. It has a permanent population of around 1,045 inhabitants and is situated 37 metres above sea level. The town has a Muslim mosque.
