= Garowol =

- Location in the Gambia
- Coordinates: 13°25′N 13°56′W
- Country: The Gambia
- Division: Upper River Division
- District: Kantora
- Elevation: 69 ft (21 m)

Population (2012 (est))
  - Total: 8,124

Garowol or Garawoll is a small town in eastern Gambia near the border with Senegal. It is located in Kantora District in the Upper River Division. As of 2012, it has an estimated population of 8,124.

Jundala Forest Park is located nearby.
