= Batokunku =

- Village
- Location within The Gambia
- Coordinates: 13°19′24″N 16°48′3″W
- Country: The Gambia

Population (2013)
  - Total: 2,000

Batokunku (also spelled Batukunku) is a village located in Kombo South, one of the nine districts of The Gambia's Western Division. In January 2009, the village became notable as the location of the first wind turbine erected in West Africa. The 150 kilowatt turbine, a second-hand machine originally built by the Danish wind energy manufacturer Bonus, currently provides electrical power for the entire village. The windmill is currently serviced/maintained by Global Energy (generator service) based in the nearby village of Tujereng in collaboration with Windstrom SH from Germany.
