= Bantanto =

- Location in the Gambia
- Coordinates: 13°35′N 15°9′W
- Country: Gambia
- Division: Central River Division
- District: Niamina East

Population (2012)
  - Total: 1,395

Bantanto is a town in central Gambia. It is located in Niamina East District in the Central River Division. As of 2008, it has an estimated population of 1,322.
