= Bakadaji =

- Location in the Gambia
- Coordinates: 13°18′8.7″N 14°23′15.5″W
- Country: Gambia
- Division: Upper River Division
- District: Fulladu East

Population (2012)
  - Total: 2,226

Bakadaji is a town in eastern Gambia. It is located in Fulladu East District in the Upper River Division. As of 2008, it has an estimated population of 2,151.
