= Banyakang =

Coordinates: 13.323937°N 16.745705°W

- Interactive map of Banyakang
- Country: Gambia
- Division: Western Division

Population (2008)
  - Total: 1,134

Banyakang is a town in western Gambia. It is located in the Western Division. As of 2008, it has an estimated population of 1,134.
