= William Hutton (colonial administrator) =

British writer and colonial administrator (1793–1839)

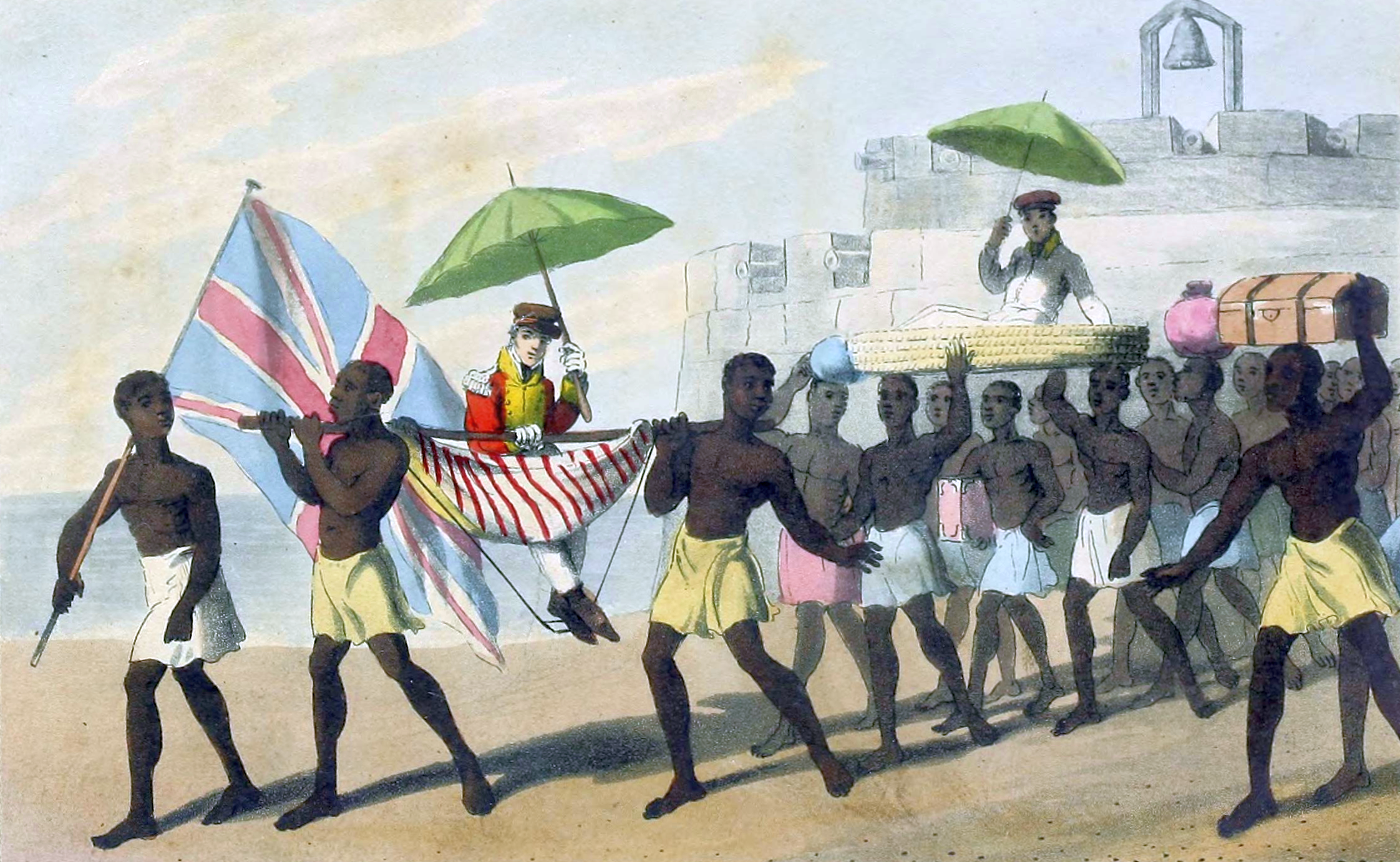
A drawing of Hutton travelling in Africa in 1820.

William Hutton (1793 – 10 November 1839) was a British writer. He is notable for having written A Voyage to Africa, which was published in 1821. He also served briefly in the British foreign service in the Ashanti Empire and as Commandant of St Mary's Island, the Gambia.

== Colonial service ==
=== Ashanti ===
Hutton was employed as a writer with the British African Company of Merchants. In 1819, Hutton travelled with Joseph Dupuis, British Consul at Kumasi, to the Cape Coast. It is an account of these events that led Hutton to write A Voyage to Africa. In January 1820, Hutton was part of a British party that received Adum, the nephew of the King of Ashanti, at Cape Coast.

==== Writing ====
Hutton wrote A Voyage to Africa in 1820. It was published in London in 1821. It was a part-travelogue, and part-diplomatic chronicle. It is likely that it would have been read in both Britain and in the United States, where British books were often imported.

=== The Gambia ===
In 1829, Hutton became Acting Commandant of St Mary's Island after the previous Commandant, Alexander Findlay, returned to Britain. While temporarily in charge of the administration, Hutton made a voyage up the river to Fattatenda and Kantalikunda. Eleven Bathurst merchants had agreed to send goods up the river, provided Hutton could make satisfactory local treaties. On 11 April 1829, he agreed to pay £50 to the chief of Kantalikunda if he allowed Bathurst merchants to set up houses and factories in the town.

On 13 April 1829, Hutton entered into another treaty, with Mansa Kwiri, the King of Wuli. It stated that in return for an annual payment of £200, the King would grant the British full access to and sovereignty over Fattatenda and 100 acres of land surrounding it. When news of these treaties reached London, they did not meet with the approval of Robert William Hay. Findlay was instructed to investigate the treaties when he returned to the Gambia to take up the role of Lieutenant Governor. In particular, there were concerns over expenses that Hutton incurred, including a significant wine bill that he debited to the colonial government. Upon investigation, it was decided to dismiss Hutton from colonial service. Formerly of Kent Road, London, he died at Wells, Somerset, on 10 November 1839, aged 46.
