= Jarra East =

District of the Gambia

Coordinates: 13°25′N 15°15′W

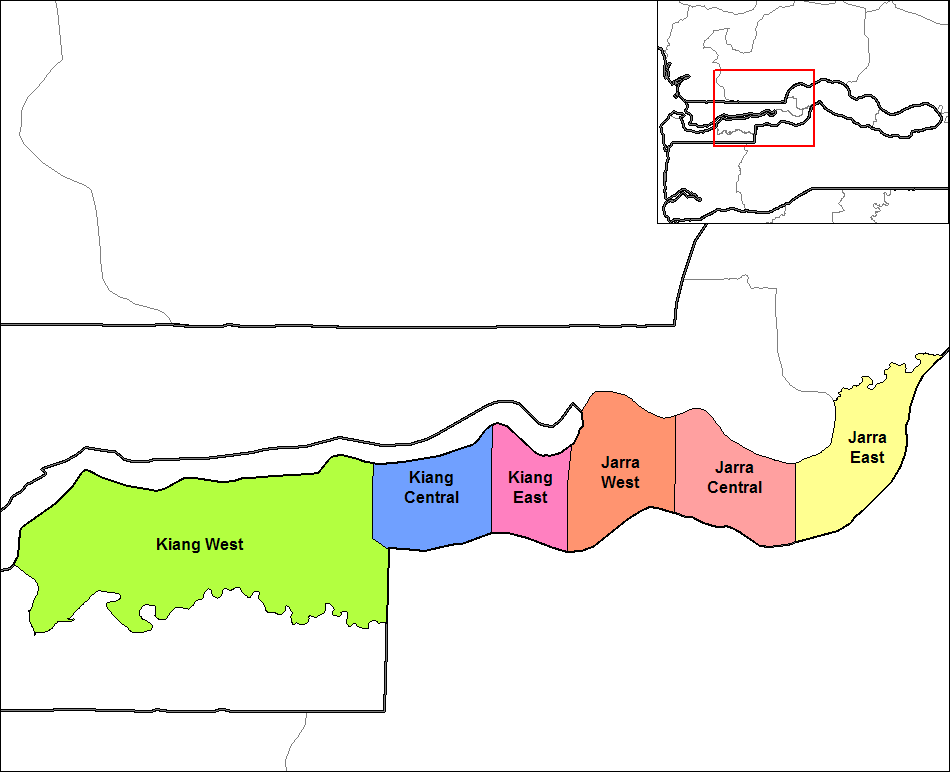
Districts of Lower River Division

Jarra East is one of the six districts of the Lower River Division of the Gambia. In the 2013 census, it had a population of 16,551.
