= Banjulunding =

Coordinates: 13°22′32″N 16°39′25″W

- Interactive map of Banjulunding
- Country: Gambia
- Division: Western Division
- District: Kombo North/Saint Mary

Population (2008)
  - Total: 8,029

Banjulinding is a town in western Gambia. It is located in Kombo North/Saint Mary District in the Western Division. As of 1989, it has an estimated population of 8,029.
