= Bundu (state) =

Former state in West Africa

Boundou
- 1690–1858
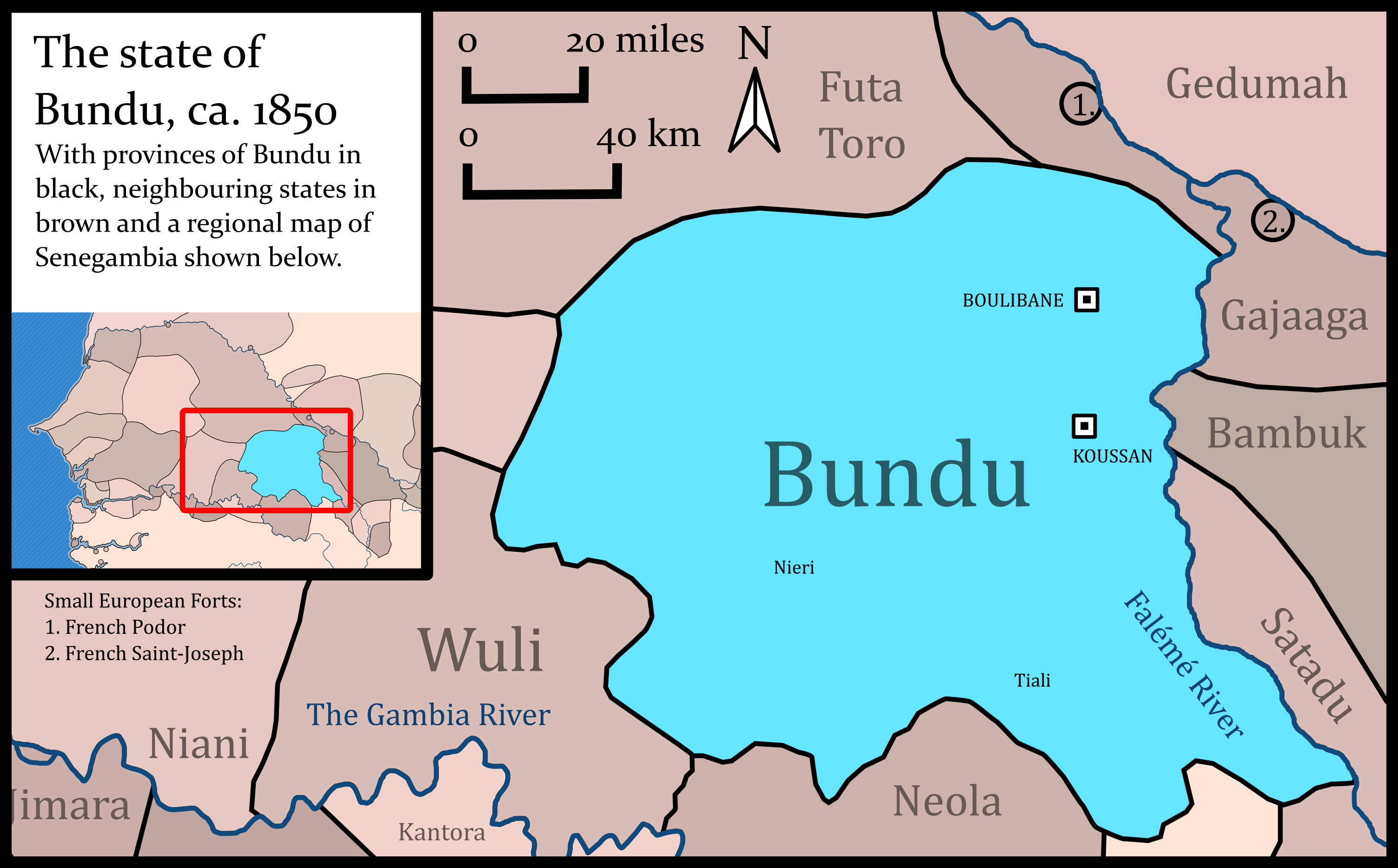
- Bundu territorial extent c. 1850
- Capital: Koussan, Bulibani
- Common languages: Fula
- Religion: Islam
- Government: Theocracy
- Almamy, Eliman
  - 1690–1699: Malick Daouda Si
  - 1891–1905: Maalik Ture
- Historical era: Early Modern Period
  - Established: 1690
  - Disestablished: 1858
Preceded by	Succeeded by
Gajaaga	French West Africa

Bundu (also Bondu, Bondou and Boundou) was a state in West Africa, existing from the late 17th century until it became a French protectorate dependent on the colony of Senegal. Its territory was located between the Falémé River and the upper course of the Gambia River, between 13 and 15 degrees north latitude, and 12 and 13 degrees west longitude.

== Description ==
The country is an elevated plateau, with hills in the southern and central parts. These are generally unproductive and covered with stunted wood, but the lower country is fertile and finely clothed with baobab, tamarind and various valuable fruit trees. Bondu is traversed by torrents which flow rapidly during the rains but are empty in the dry season. The name Bundu means "well" in Pulaar.

== History ==
=== Early history ===
Bundu in the 17th century was a sparsely populated part of the kingdom of Gajaaga, inhabited mostly by Pulaar communities, but with minorities of Jakhanke, Soninke and other peoples.

=== Malick Sy ===
In 1690, Fula Torodbe cleric Malick Sy came to the region from his home near Podor in the Futa Toro region. He and his followers may have been fleeing persecution in the aftermath of the Char Bouba war or simply seeking a place where Sy could enforce his interpretation of sharia law. The tunka of Gajaaga gave Sy control first over one village and then a larger territory, the border of which Sy manipulated to his advantage by cheating on a pact with the king. Sy settled the lands with relatives from his native Futa Toro and Muslim immigrants from as far west as the Kingdom of Jolof and as far east as Nioro du Sahel.

Under Sy, Bundu became a refuge for Muslims and Islamic scholars persecuted by traditional rulers in other kingdoms. It eventually expanded east, taking territory from Bambuk. Bundu's growth set a precedent for later Fula jihads in West Africa. Sy was killed in 1699 when he was caught in an ambush by the army of Gajaaga.

=== After Malick Sy ===
Sy was succeeded by his son Bubu Malick Sy, who expanded the realm southwards at the expense of local Mandinka kingdoms. By 1716, Bundu was the most powerful state on the upper Senegal. When he, in turn died between 1718 and 1727, an interregnum ensued that threatened both Sisibe's (the descendants of Malick Sy) control over the state and the integrity of its central authority. This was, however, restored by Bubu's son Maka Jiba between 1731 and 1735.

From the 1720s to the 1760s, Bundu suffered Moroccan and Moorish slave raids, as did the neighboring states of Gajaaga, Bambuk, and Futa Toro. Maka Jiba died in 1764 and was succeeded by his son Amadi Gai, who adopted the title of almamy and introduced a legal system based on sharia. The division between the Bulibani and Koussan branches of the family, which would be the source of many succession disputes, originated at this time.

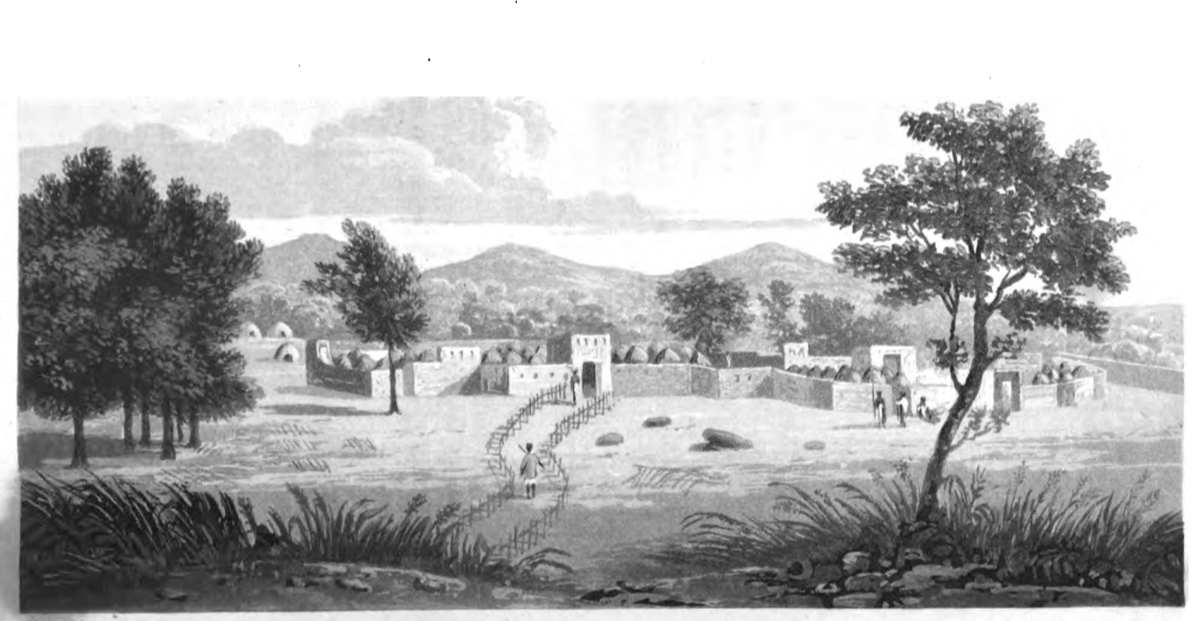
Boolibani, the capital of Bundu, in 1818

Daniel Houghton and Mungo Park passed through Bondu in 1791 and 1795, respectively, and both had to submit to many exactions from the reigning monarch. The royal residence was then at Fatteconda, but when Major William Gray, a British officer who attempted to solve the Niger problem, visited Bondu in 1818, it had been moved to Bulibani (Boolibany), a village with a population of 1,500–1,800, surrounded by a strong clay wall.

=== 19th century ===
The French established a fort at Bakel in Gajaaga in 1820, followed by a brief presence at Sansanding in Bundu itself. Almamy Saada Amadi Aissata Sy, trying to promote trade, agreed to allow a permanent fort built at Senudebou in 1845, though this became a source of contention within the Sisibe ruling class. He also hoped to gain French support for the alliance he was building with the Imamate of Futa Toro and Bambuk against Kaarta, the only state on the upper Senegal that could rival Bundu at this time. But the Europeans, while happy to see Kaarta humbled, did not want Bundunke hegemony either.

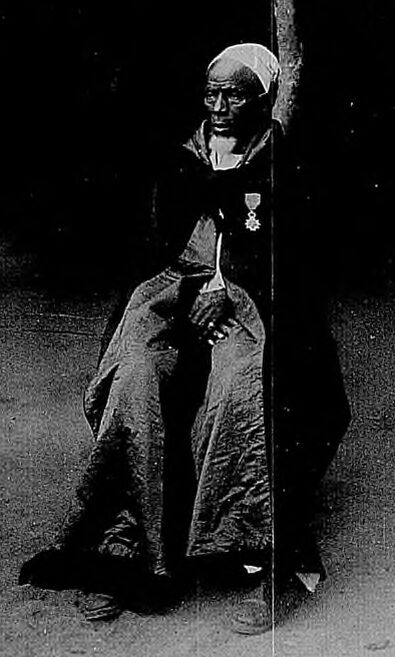
Bubakar Saada, Almamy of Bundu, in 1882, wearing a French medal

In 1851 Saada Amadi died and a civil war broke out. El Hadj Umar Tall took advantage, taking over the area initially with the support of both the people and the Bundu aristocracy. Many Fulbe migrated east to Nioro du Sahel, heart of Tall's Toucouleur Empire. In 1855 Bokar Saada Sy, son of Saada Amadi, claimed the title of almamy with French support, but only managed to exert real control over Bundu after Tall's 1857 defeat at the Siege of Medina Fort with French military support. During this period warfare and famine devastated the economy, and Tall's call for Muslims to emigrate eastwards to his domain dramatically reduced the population, particularly among the Fulbe.

In the 1860s and 70s the Sisibe under Bokar Saada rebuilt their wealth through extensive raiding and trading for slaves and cattle as well as taxing the people. By the late 19th century two thirds of the population was enslaved. After the closing of the Senoudebou fort in 1862, Saada was the most powerful representative of French interests east of Bakel. He used this position to continually raid neighboring states for captives and booty, particularly the Kingdom of Wuli.

Nevertheless, in the face of popular discontent, a series of famines and plague outbreaks, and renewed succession disputes, the state was fragile. Mahmadu Lamine's popular 1885-7 jihad briefly drove the Sisibe out of power until French military power defeated the jihadist forces and restored them to the throne. With this, French control was effectively complete. The last almamy, chosen by the French, died in 1902.

=== Colonialism ===
Early years of French control saw a rising population as many former migrants returned. Starting in 1904, however, conditions deteriorated significantly, and large-scale famines forced much of the population to move within or leave Bundu. Slaves in particular took the opportunity to flee or renegotiate their situations, and many joined the French army during World War 1. With the growth of the peanut basin and the reorientation of trade towards the Dakar-Niger Railway, Bundu was increasingly ignored by the colonial administration. The area was economically marginalized, but also saw a flourishing of religious communities deliberately separating themselves from the pagan French.

== Government and society ==
Although nominally a theocracy, Bundu was founded peacefully rather than through religious revolts such as occurred in Futa Toro and Futa Djallon. This, as well as the presence of large numbers of non-Fulbe and/or non-Muslim inhabitants, meant that Bundu was more secular than other Fula states of the period, though Islam was a source of prestige and legitimacy as well as causus belli for slaving raids and conquest. Over time increased Fulbe immigration from these more Islamized areas increased the Muslim population. Still, Bundu never attempted to spread Islam beyond its borders.

Bundu purchased weapons from both the French on the Senegal River and the British on the Gambia River, helping them become a regional power and rival to non-Muslim Kaarta. These weapons also, however, sparked internal conflict over rulership between rival branches of the Sisibe family based in Koussan and Bulibani.

=== List of Almamis ===
- Maalik Daouda (Maalik Si) (1693-99)
- Bubu Maalik (1700-02), (1719-27)
- Tumaane Bohi (1727-31 ?)
- Interregnum (1731-35 ?)
- Maka Jiba (1735-64)
- Amadi Gai (1764-86)
- Muusa Gai (1786-90)
- Seega Gai (1790-97)
- Amadi Aissata (1797-1819)
- Muusa Yeero Maalik Aissata (1819-26)
- Tumaane-Moodi (1827-35)
- Maalik Kumba (1835-37)
- Saada Amadi Aissata (1837-51)
- Amadu Amadi Makumba (1852-53)
- Interregnum and civil war (1853-54)
- Umar Saane (1854-56)
- Bokar Saada (1856-85)
- Umar Penda (1885-86)
- Saada Amadi Saada (1886-88)
- Usman Caasi (1888-91)
- Maalik Ture (1891-1905)

== Economy ==
Bundu benefited from a position athwart major trade routes in gold, ivory, kola nuts, salt, cloth, cotton, gum arabic, and cattle. Large numbers of slaves taken in raids against neighboring communities worked the almamy's plantations or were sold on to Moorish or Wolof buyers. Visitors in the late 18th century described a flourishing local agricultural industry, with particularly fine horses, and domestic production of incense, cotton, and indigo.

== Notable people ==
- Ayuba Suleiman Diallo (1701—1773), slave trader who was enslaved by the Mandinka
- Richard Pierpoint, freed slave, British Army soldier and farmer in Fergus, Ontario Canada

== Sources ==
- Clark, Andrew (1996). "The Fulbe of Bundu (Senegambia): From Theocracy to Secularization". The International Journal of African Historical Studies. 29 (1): 1–23. doi:10.2307/221416.
- Curtin, Philip D. (1975). "The uses of oral tradition in Senegambia : Maalik Sii and the foundation of Bundu". Cahiers d'études africaines. 15 (58): 189–202. doi:10.3406/cea.1975.2592.
- Gomez, Michael (1987). "Bundu in the Eighteenth Century". The International Journal of African Historical Studies. 20 (1): 61–73.
- Gomez, Michael (2002). Pragmatism in the Age of Jihad: The Precolonial State of Bundu (2nd ed.). UK: Cambridge University Press. ISBN 9780521528474.
- Gray, William (Major) (1825). Travels in Western Africa: In the Years 1818, 19, 20, and 21, from the River Gambia, through Woolli, Bondoo, Galam, Kassam, Kaarta, and Foolidoo, to the River Niger. London: John Murray.
- Park, Mungo (1799). Travels in the Interior Districts of Africa: Performed Under the Direction and Patronage of the African Association, in the Years 1795, 1796, and 1797. London: W. Bulmer and Company.
