= Nema Kunku =

Village in the Brikama Local Government Area, Gambia

- Location in the Gambia
- Coordinates: 13°24′13″N 16°41′00″W
- Country: Gambia
- Local Government Area: Brikama
- Elevation: 29 m (95 ft)

Population (2013)
  - Total: 36,134

Nema Kunku is a village in the Brikama Local Government Area, Gambia. As of the 2013 census, Nema Kunku had a population of 36,134.

Nema Kunku is located near Serekunda, with most of tourism to the area being sparked by Serekunda and the capital, Banjul. Some individuals have taken advantage of the tourism, by operating businesses labeled with names related to such places.

== See also ==
- Abuko
