= Kingdom of Wuli =

Former country in present-day Gambia

Kingdom of Wuli Wuuli Mansa Banko
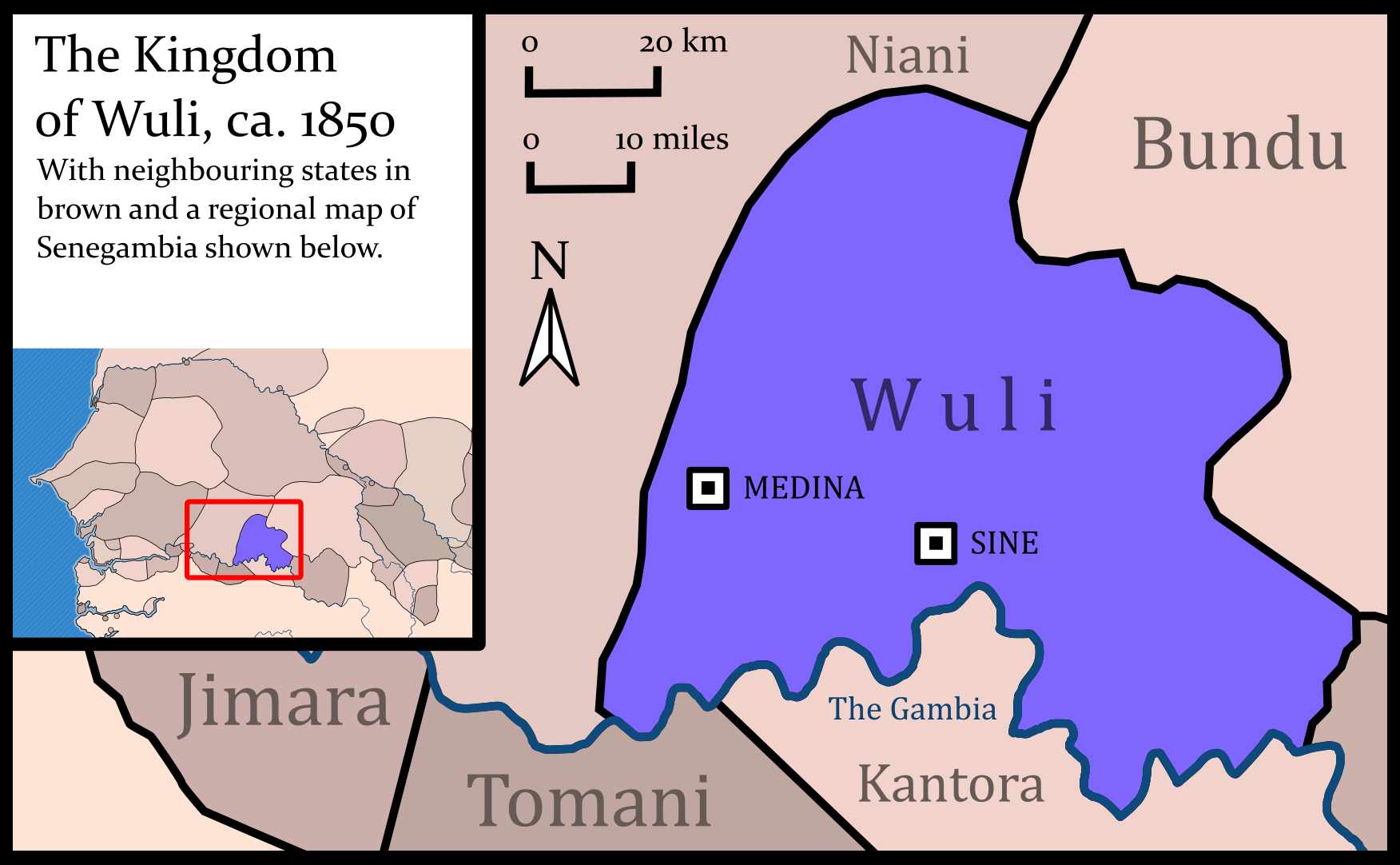
- Wuli c. 1850
- Capital: Medina Ouli
- Common languages: Mandinka
- Religion: African traditional religions, Islam
- Government: Monarchy
- Mansa
  - 13th century (first): Mbari Kajo Wali
  - d. 1936 (last): Yaka Sara Wali
- History
  - Tiramakhan Traore's migration: mid-13th century
  - Reign of Jalali Mansa, Wuli becomes independent of the Jolof Empire: early 17th century
  - Vassal of Bundu: by 1867
  - Wali royal lineages accept British hegemony, become district chiefs: 1894
- Currency: cloth
Preceded by	Succeeded by
Mali Empire	Gambia Colony and Protectorate; French Senegal

Wuli (spelled Ouli in French) was a Mandinka kingdom located on the north bank of the Gambia River in what is now the eastern portion of The Gambia and the Tambacounda region of Senegal.

Initially a tributary to the Mali Empire and later the Jolof Empire, Wuli became independent in the 16th century under the leadership of Mansa Jalali Wali. The Wali dynasty were staunch followers of their traditional religion, and Wuli became embroiled in the Soninke-Marabout Wars of the 19th century, suffering regular raids and invasions from neighboring Bundu and other Islamic states.

Wuli society was strictly segmented, with a ruling class, a class of Muslim traders (the juula), freemen, artisans, and slaves. The state controlled an important crossroads for trading routes which moved salt, gold, manufactures and other commodities between the upper Niger River valley and the coast. The slave trade was also a major source of wealth for the rulers and juula, and when it ended in the 1820s they reoriented Wuli's economy towards groundnut production. At the same time, Europeans expanded their commercial interests in the upper Gambia River valley, and in 1889 Wuli was divided between the British and the French colonial empires.

== History ==
=== Founding of the state ===
Before the Mandinka arrived, the area that became Wuli was inhabited by the Konyagui people, the Bainuks and a few Wolofs. The earliest Mandinka immigrants, presumably Jula traders, came before the founding of the Mali Empire.

According to oral tradition, the first large-scale Mandinka migration came from Mali in the mid-13th century and was led by Tiramakhan Traore, one of Sundiata's top generals. The first Wulimansa was Mbari Kajo Wali, who came with Traore, learned magic from the Jola people of the lower Gambia, and used his power to establish lordship over the land as a vassal of the mansa of Mali. He and other early mansas are quasi-legendary figures, and were based east of what became Wuli itself, around Dialacoto.

Wuli was one of the first satellite states of the Mali Empire, but modern-day historians have proposed that the kingdom's Mandinka elite did not migrate en masse from the Manding region. They may have come much earlier, from Bambouk and the upper Senegal River valley. The story of Mandinka migrations into the Gambia river valley may also be a later dramatization of a gradual process of cultural and ethnic change that occurred under the cultural and political influence of the Mali Empire.

As Mali declined, Wuli fell under the hegemony of the Jolof Empire and paid tribute to the Buurba, as did their neighboring states on the north bank of the Gambia—Niumi, Badibou, and Nyani.

=== An independent power ===
Jalali Wali was the first Mansa for whom history has recorded details. He founded his capital of Jalalikunda in the north of Wuli, after defeating the local Konyagui king. This was an unsettled period, with Denianke raids weakening both the Jolof and Mali empires. During the 1520s, under his leadership, Wuli became fully independent and fought off another invasion from Futa Toro, perhaps led by Koli Tenguella. Jalali recruited new inhabitants, including the Jatta family from Gajaaga who settled in Tambacounda, the Baro family of Barrow Kunda, and the Jabbis (among others) in Sutukoba. He was killed in battle fighting against the Kingdom of Niani, but he left behind the most powerful state on the north bank of the Gambia.

Jalali's death was followed by a period of confusion. According to legend, his youngest son Kope had tricked his dying father into giving him the secrets of rulership and the royal amulets, but his elder brothers drove him into exile and struggled to establish control over Wuli. Kope eventually returned with a marabout from Kaabu who helped him take control of the country from his base at Medina Ouli. His branch of the Wali family ruled until the fall of the state in the late 19th century and claimed the kingship well into the 20th century.

The late 16th century was Wuli's golden age. The Mali Empire had a brief resurgence, with Wuli serving as its most important tributary in the west, a central distribution point for the trade in gold and slaves, and a center of political power rivalling Kaabu to the south. This phase did not last, however, and Mali's terminal decline and the Denianke's control of trade routes to the interior left Wuli economically important but no longer politically dominant by the 1620s.

In the mid-1700s, Mandinka refugees from Contou in the Faleme river valley fled attacks by Maka Jiba, Almamy of Boundou, and founded Tambacounda. Jiba's successor Amadi Gai, however, allied himself with Wuli rather than continue expanding.

The late 18th and early 19th centuries saw a significant influx of Torodbe Muslim refugees from Futa Toro, who helped popularize Islam in Wuli, although the ruling class maintained many traditional beliefs. Mansa Jatta Wali ruled Wuli in the second half of the 18th century and fought several wars against Niani, as well as an armed dispute with a wealthy Jula trader. He was succeeded by Mansa Faring, who jealously guarded Wuli's trading interests against the British in the early 19th century.

=== European Contact ===
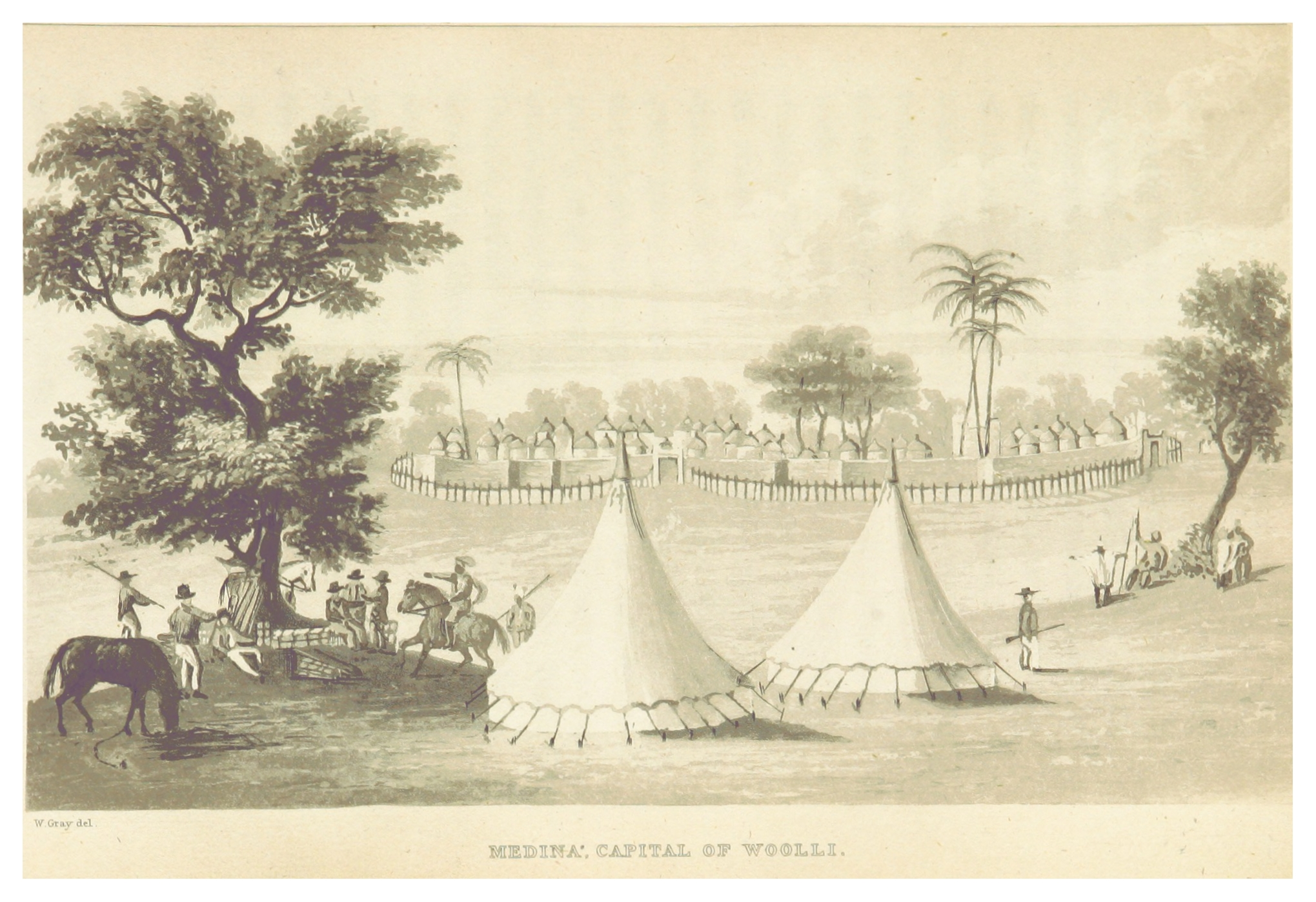
Madina, capital of Wuli, in 1818

Around the turn of the 19th century, the Scottish explorer Mungo Park passed through Wuli on both of his voyages to the Niger River. In March 1823, a British expedition led by Major Alexander Grant came upriver to Wuli from Bathurst, seeking closer commercial relations. Mansa Faring refused to grant the British any trading concessions. Mansa Nkoi (also known as Koyo) came to power in 1827 and was much friendlier to European trade. The end of the Atlantic slave trade had dramatically impacted the Wuli elite's main sources of revenue—slave raiding, slave trading, and taxing slave caravans. In 1829, Nkoi ceded Fattatenda to the British administrator William Hutton for $2000 ($60469 today) up front and an annual payment of $200 ($6047 today). The agreement was later repudiated by the British government, however. Still, Nkoi protected Wuli's position as the easternmost center of trade on the Gambia by restricting British access to Tenda and Bundu to the east. The domestic slave population of Wuli grew significantly, as people who might otherwise have been sold were instead put to work on farms growing peanuts for export.

=== Soninke-Marabout Wars ===
By the 1830s, Wuli, like much of the region, was divided between the Muslim (marabout) population and a larger animist (Soninke) group. The kingdom was regularly being raided by nearby marabout states, particularly Bundu, which regarded non-Muslim Wuli as a perennial source of plunder and slaves. Wuli suffered significant attacks in 1810, 1829, 1832, and 1848.

The Wulimansa in the second half of the 19th century, Nyanamadi, was a gentle but ineffective ruler, overshadowed by his brother Fenda Mamadi. From 1863 to 1865, the almamy of Bundu, Bokar Saada, led an alliance of Futa Toro, Khasso and other powers to repeatedly attack the important Wuli trading center of Tambacounda. In 1866, a 12,000-man Bundu army burned the British trading post of Fattatenda as the almamy looked to destroy any entrepots that he could not control. In January 1867, Saada again marched through Wuli to Madina, where the Wulimansa quickly surrendered and paid tribute to him, although Bundu slave raids continued. During the 1860s and 1870s, Musa Molo, king of Fuladu, tried to conquer Wuli but was repulsed.

This period of upheaval saw the Buurba Jolof sack Medina Ouli in 1875. The three major royal lineages, known as the suma, each settled in a different village. One went to Manjankunda, one to Maleng, and the main royal branch to Sine (close to the Senegal-Gambia border today). The unity of the state disintegrated, and local families became increasingly powerful and often predatory. As a satellite of Bundu, which was allied with the French, Wuli became a target for the Sarakholle marabout Mahmadu Lamine Drame. The French forced Drame out of Bundu, and set up a base at Toubakouta in Niani, where he was killed attacked and killed by a French-led force that included some Wulinke troops.

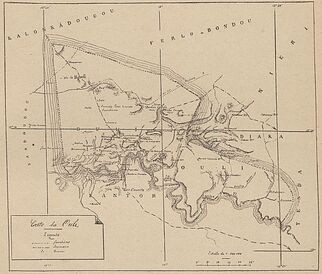
A map of the Kingdom of Wuli from the 1890s

=== Colonization ===
In 1888, Wuli became a protectorate of France. When France and Britain set the colonial boundary between The Gambia and Senegal in the 1890s, Wuli was divided in two. This division, coupled with the rise of rail transport at the expense of river trade, economically marginalized much of the area. Some of the ruling class had anticipated the division by establishing a new capital at Bantunding in the British section, but their progressive loss of prestige and power continued. By 1894, the Walis had accepted a yearly stipend from the British in return for restrictions on their activities, and had lost much of their pre-colonial legitimacy in the eyes of the local population. In 1895, the French created a cercle of Ouli with its capital at Sine, but two years later moved the administration to Makacolibantang. In 1919, the seat of administration moved again to Tambacounda.

The increasing cost of food and the introduction of compound taxes rendered former masters unable to support their slaves, and the system of forced labor and social differentiation collapsed. The last sovereign Mansa of Wuli, Yaka Sara Wali, died in 1936, although his son Kali was crowned and continued to claim the title.

== Economy ==
Wuli, particularly the important commercial and religious center of Sutukoba, was a hub for the trade in slaves, salt, gold, leather, shellfish, beeswax, European manufactures and other goods, linking the Atlantic coast, the Senegal River, and the Manding heartland in the Niger River basin. The economic and political power of the Jula traders was instrumental in the founding and growth of the state. After the end of the Atlantic slave trade in the early 19th century, much of Wuli's agricultural resource base was dedicated to farming groundnuts for export through Fattatenda. The weaving, dying, and export of cotton cloth was also a major source of revenue. During the 19th century, Wuli developed a local industry manufacturing a kind of gunpowder called timbertio.

== Society ==
Society and governance were divided into levels: the state (banko), extended family or interest group (kabilo), village (sateo), and compound (suo). Each division took care of its own judicial, legislative, and executive functions. The Mansa was responsible for general law and order, including policing roads, war and relations with other states, and preventing or prosecuting major crimes. Kabilos regulated family affairs, marriages, inheritance, divorce, land, etc. Villages dealt with their public works and agricultural questions.

Slavery was an essential part of society and foundation of elite power. With the number of slaves increasing over time through raids, they constituted approximately 40% of the population by the early 19th century, and as much as two thirds by the end of the century. Free families, including the royal lineages, maintained their positions through politics, threats of violence, religious taboos, and the strategic swearing of dongkuto ritual alliances between patrilineages. The Nyamalo, or craftsmen castes, were free but ritually bound to a particular free caste as clients, with mutual rights and responsibilities between them. For example, the leatherworkers (karanke) were given the right to speak first in public interest meetings, as they were considered the politically weakest social group.

== Government ==
The Mansa ruled through the council of state, the Mansa Bengo, staffed with the heads of the most important families, villages, and interest groups. The public treasury (furuba) was supported by war booty, taxes generally paid in kind once a year, duties on local juulas (merchants) or on European traders and other travellers, and gifts from villages or lineages attempting to curry favor with the Mansa. Fula pastoralists paid taxes at a time and quantity decided by the ruler, arbitrarily, but taking care not to push them to emigrate.

Royal Mansajong slaves, based at court, were a hereditary class that served as the soldiers, tax collectors, and the executive branch of government. They were very politically powerful, especially during an interregnum following the death of a king. Their sheer numbers, along with the Mansa's near-monopoly on gunpowder, were critical to protecting the ruling dynasty from rebellion, despite legal and widespread gun ownership. At the monarch's death, the Mansajong served as mediators between the rival royal lineages (known as suma), who could legitimately aspire to the throne and competed with each other in doling out gifts and favors to curry support. The governor of the capital city played a similarly important role as neutral arbiter.

There were no official subdivisions of Wuli—each village was independent of the others and owed its allegiance directly to the Mansa. Influential men could, however, come to control large networks of people and resources. These included the Nimang of Pathiab, the successor to the throne and guardian of the northwestern frontier near Koussanar, as well as the powerful and relatively independent Signate clan of Netteboulou.

=== List of Mansas of Wuli ===
The following list was provided by Manekeba Suso, but the relationship between the various rulers, their lineages, and dates are not firmly established.

1. Mbari Kajo
2. Jattery Bookery
3. Jalali
4. Kope
5. Nkoi
6. Mantamba
7. Salamang
8. Ndemu
9. Kemintang
10. Ndena
11. Faring
12. Nyanamang
13. Birang
14. Jatta
15. Jumu
16. Nyanamamadi
17. Nkoi (Yaka Sara)
18. Kali

== Religion ==
The jalang (fetish) of the Wali family is known as Tamba Jalli, and its worship served as Wuli's state religion. Its form is a three-bladed tamba (spear) wrapped in white hand-woven cloth called fataro. Jalali Wali was believed to have brought it with him when he settled in Wuli. The Mansa regularly sacrificed to the jalang and consulted it for divination; in extreme circumstances, human sacrifices were required, generally in the form of a warrior who went to battle exposed without expecting to return. In 1887, two Wuli princes volunteered to die to guarantee a victory against Mamadu Lamine, and succeeded on both counts. The jalang is still housed and venerated at Sinthiou-Maleme.

Muslims were a part of the earliest Mandinka migrations into Wuli, and marabouts served the Mansas as scribes and charm-makers for centuries. Other Jakhanke students of Al-Hajj Salim Suwari arrived later. As they remained outside the state religion, they were sometimes viewed with distrust. Nevertheless, even during the widespread religious wars of the mid-19th century, the marabouts of Wuli generally stayed away from overtly political activity, and the Walis continued to protect them and seek prayers and charms from them.

== Sources ==
- Gailey, Harry A. (1987). Historical Dictionary of The Gambia (4th ed.). Metuchen, NJ: Scarecrow Press. ISBN 0810820013.
- Galloway, Winifred (1975). A History of Wuli from the Thirteenth to the Nineteenth Century (History PhD). University of Indiana.
- Gomez, Michael (1992). Pragmatism in the Age of Jihad: The Precolonial State of Bundu (1st ed.). UK: Cambridge University Press. ISBN 9780521528474.
- Gomez, Michael (2002). Pragmatism in the Age of Jihad: The Precolonial State of Bundu (2nd ed.). UK: Cambridge University Press. ISBN 9780521528474.
- Green, Toby (2020). A Fistful of Shells. UK: Penguin Books.
- Traore, Mamadou (2021). "Les royaumes du Niani et du Wuli, des origines a la conquete coloniale". In Fall, Mamadou; Fall, Rokhaya; Mane, Mamadou (eds.). Bipolarisation du Senegal du XVIe - XVIIe siecle (in French). Dakar: HGS Editions.
- Weil, Peter (1984). "Slavery, groundnuts, and European capitalism in the Wuli Kingdom of Senegambia, 1820–1930". Research in Economic Anthropology: 77–119.
