= Basse Santa Su =

- Town
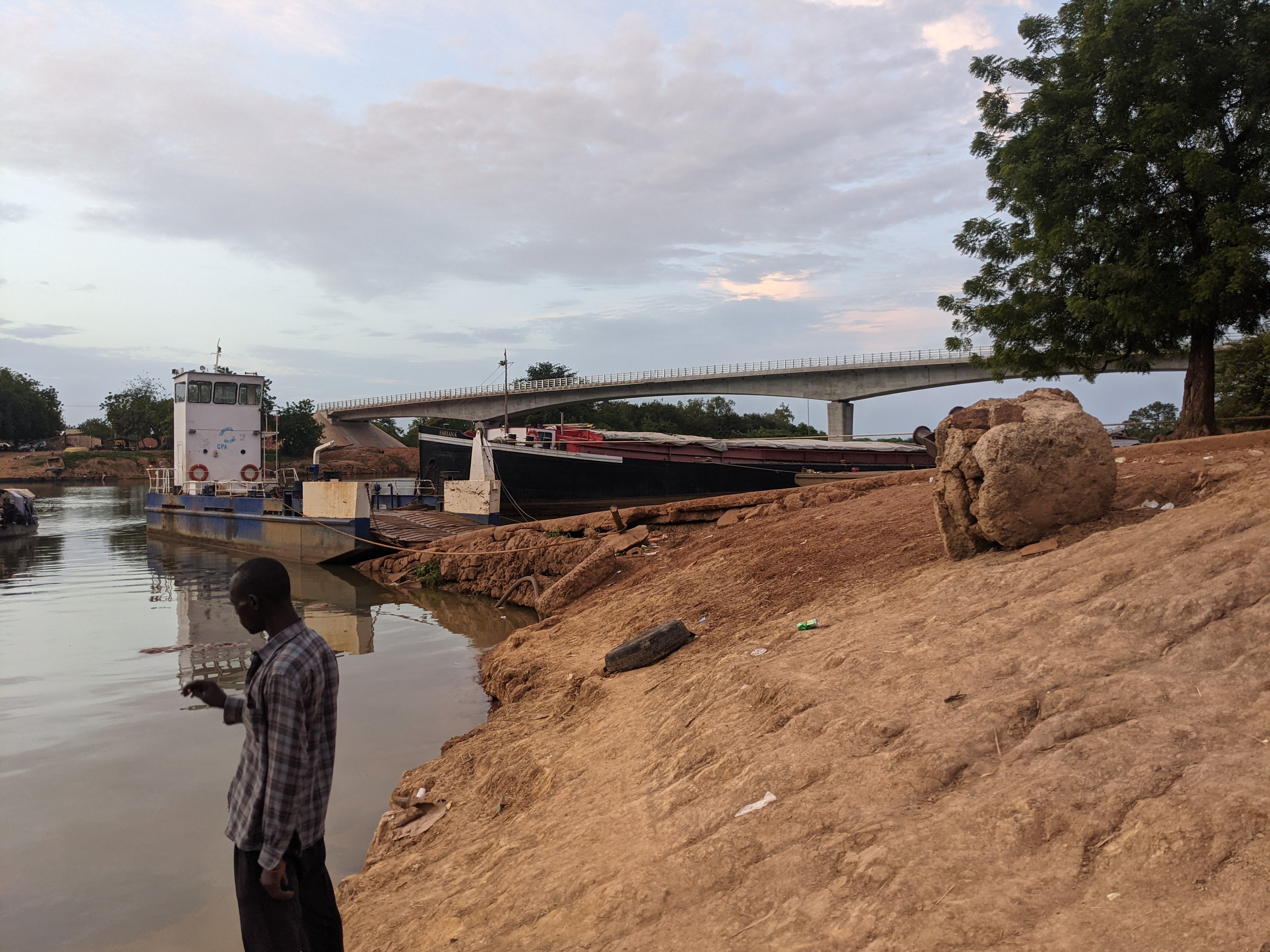
- Bridge at Basse

- Location in the Gambia
- Coordinates: 13°18′33″N 14°13′09″W
- Country: The Gambia
- Division: Upper River Division
- District: Fulladu East
- Elevation: 68 ft (21 m)

Population
  - Total: 18,414
- Time zone: UTC+00:00 (GMT)

Basse Santa Su, usually known as Basse, is a town in the Gambia, lying on the south bank of the River Gambia. The easternmost major town in the nation, it is known for its important market. Basse is the capital of the Upper River Division, which is coterminous with the Basse Local Government Area. As of 2009, the town has an estimated population of 18,414. According to the 2013 census, the Basse LGA has 243,791 residents.

Famous people include Adama Barrow, the president of Gambia.

== History ==
According to oral histories, the first Mandinka immigrants to the Gambia area, the Fati clan, settled in Tumana near Basse. They subsequently acted as hosts and/or agents for future migrants, potentially including Tiramakhan Traore. Basse was at this point a hub in regional trade networks bringing kola nuts and Guinea pepper north from what is now Guinea-Bissau and salt and salted fish up the river from the coast.

A bridge over the Gambia River, funded by the Chinese Government, opened in October 2021.

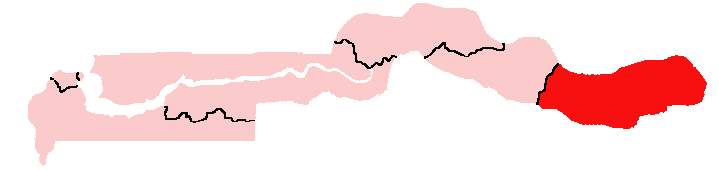
Location of the Basse Local Government Area in the Gambia

== Climate ==
Basse Santa Su has a tropical savanna climate (Köppen Aw), almost dry enough to be a hot semi-arid climate (BSh) with almost no rainfall from November to May and heavy rainfall from June to October.

Climate data for Basse (1991–2020)
Month	Jan	Feb	Mar	Apr	May	Jun	Jul	Aug	Sep	Oct	Nov	Dec	Year
Mean daily maximum °C (°F)	35.3 (95.5)	37.8 (100.0)	40.1 (104.2)	41.4 (106.5)	40.9 (105.6)	37.4 (99.3)	33.5 (92.3)	32.3 (90.1)	32.6 (90.7)	34.7 (94.5)	36.5 (97.7)	35.5 (95.9)	36.5 (97.7)
Daily mean °C (°F)	25.0 (77.0)	27.6 (81.7)	30.4 (86.7)	32.5 (90.5)	33.1 (91.6)	31.3 (88.3)	28.7 (83.7)	27.8 (82.0)	27.8 (82.0)	28.9 (84.0)	27.6 (81.7)	25.4 (77.7)	28.8 (83.8)
Mean daily minimum °C (°F)	14.6 (58.3)	17.4 (63.3)	20.6 (69.1)	23.7 (74.7)	25.4 (77.7)	25.2 (77.4)	23.8 (74.8)	23.3 (73.9)	23.0 (73.4)	23.1 (73.6)	18.9 (66.0)	15.3 (59.5)	21.2 (70.2)
Average precipitation mm (inches)	0.2 (0.01)	0.4 (0.02)	0.1 (0.00)	0.0 (0.0)	11.1 (0.44)	93.5 (3.68)	192.0 (7.56)	314.3 (12.37)	227.0 (8.94)	62.7 (2.47)	1.6 (0.06)	0.3 (0.01)	903.2 (35.56)
Average precipitation days (≥ 1.0 mm)	0.1	0.1	0.0	0.0	1.2	6.3	12.1	15.6	13.8	4.7	0.2	0.1	54.2
Source: NOAA

== Gallery ==
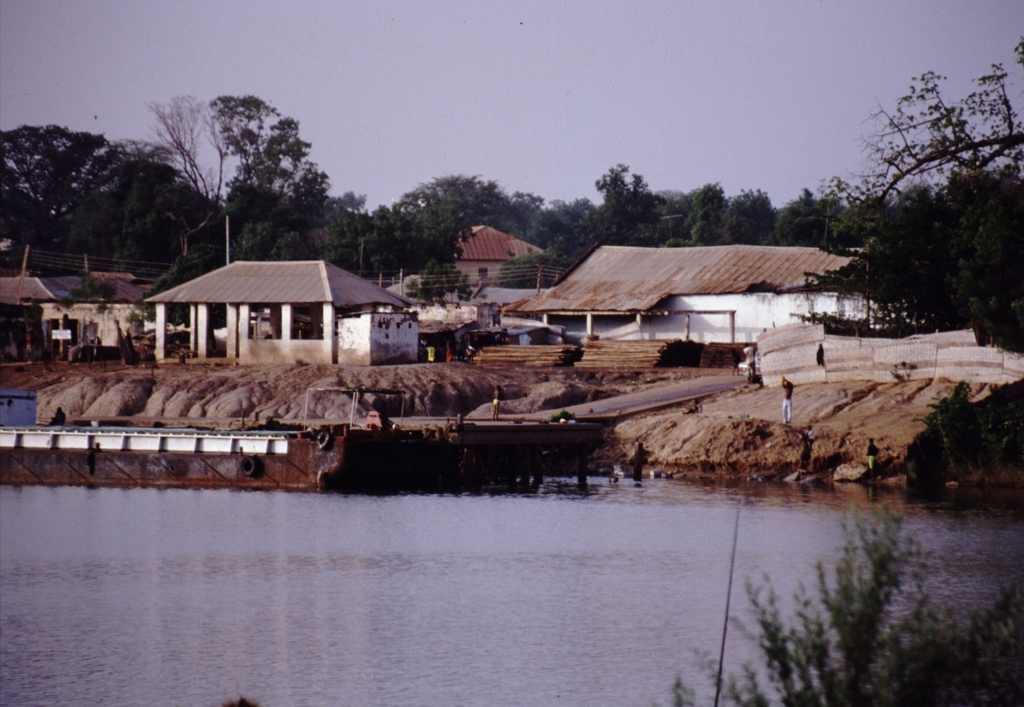
Basse riverside in 2000

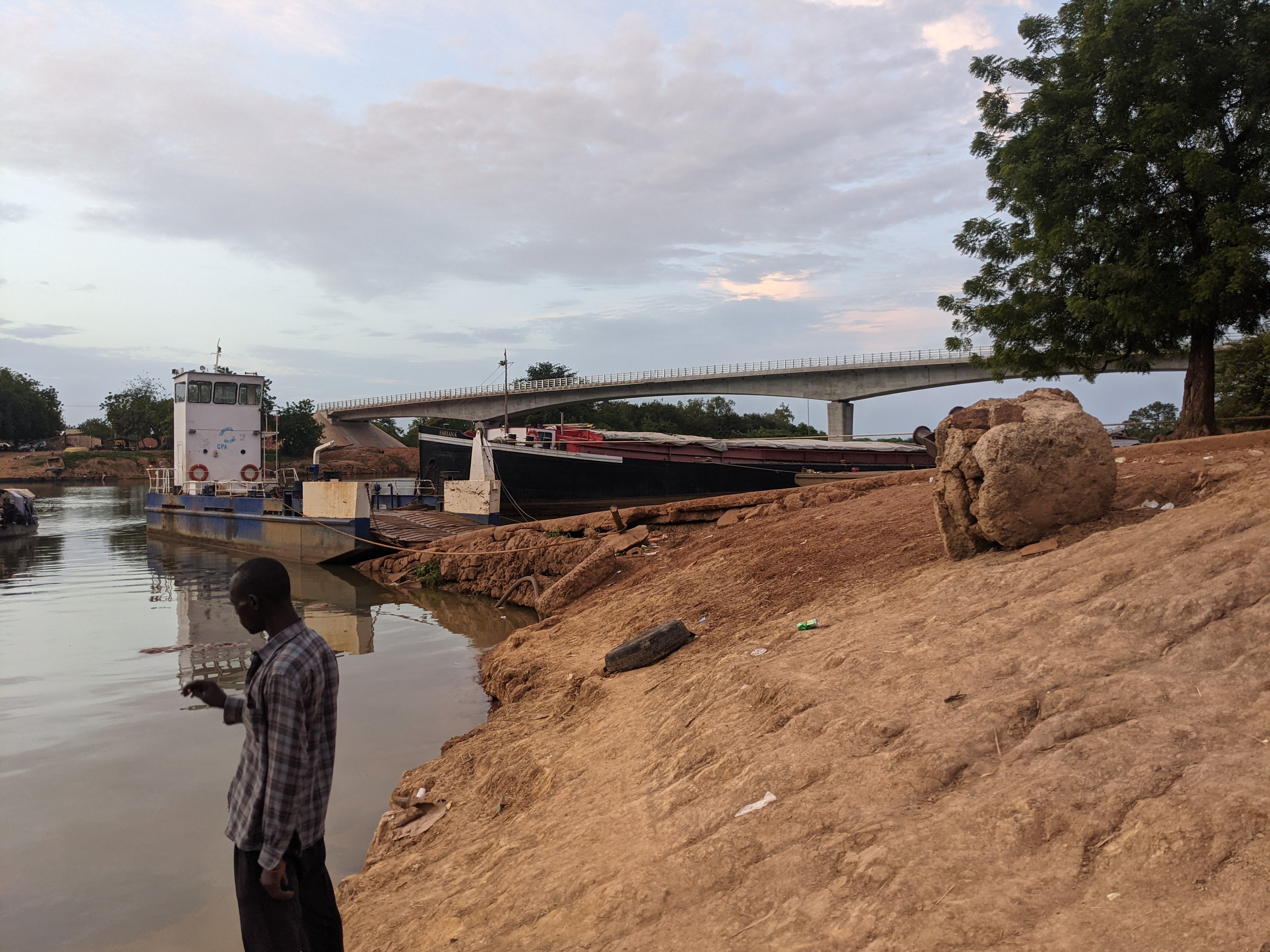
Basse riverside in 2021, showing the new bridge

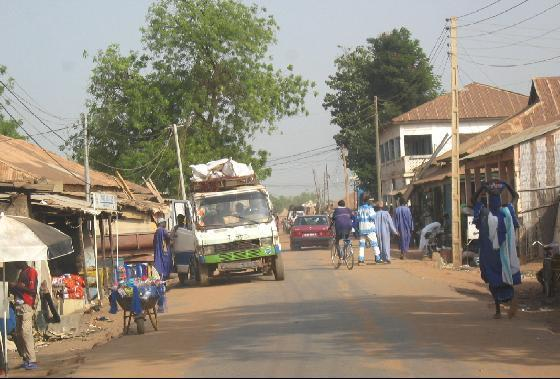
