= Wuli District =

Coordinates: 13°30′N 14°05′W

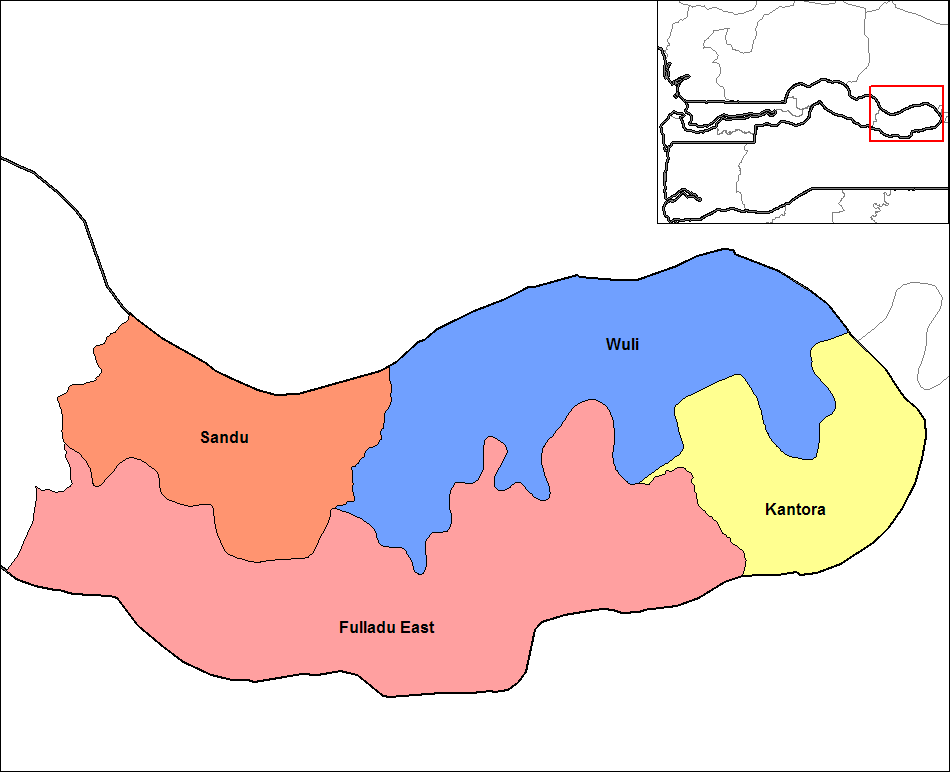
Districts of Upper River Division

Wuli District was one of the four districts of the former Upper River Division of the Gambia. The Upper River Division is now the Basse Local Government Area. Wuli was established as a parliamentary constituency in 1962 and was divided into Wuli West District and Wuli East District in 1987. The name derives from the historical region and former Mandinka kingdom of Wuli.

== Demographics ==
Year	Population
1993	29 541
2003	35 856
2008	38 678
