= List of local government areas of The Gambia by Human Development Index =

Stats of Gambian LGAs

This is a list of local government areas of The Gambia by Human Development Index as of 2024 with data for the year 2022.

Rank	LGA	HDI (2022)
Low human development
1	Kanifing	0.548
2	Banjul	0.540
3	Brikama	0.524
–	Gambia (average)	0.495
4	Kerewan	0.445
5	Mansa Konko	0.438
6	Basse Santa Su	0.421
7	Janjanbureh	0.385
8	Kuntaur	0.337
