= List of African regions by life expectancy =

This is a list of African regions according to estimation of the Global Data Lab, as of 12 October 2024. By default, regions within country are sorted by overall life expectancy in 2022. Countries are sorted by the most favorable for life expectancy region inside them.

country or special territory	region	2019				2019 →2021	2021	2021 →2022	2022				2019 →2022
country or special territory	region	overall	male	female	F Δ M	2019 →2021	overall	2021 →2022	overall	male	female	F Δ M	2019 →2022
Spain	Canary Islands (in the Atlantic Ocean)	83.06	80.57	85.66	5.09	−0.22	82.84	0.12	82.96	80.47	85.51	5.04	−0.10
Spain	Melilla (autonomous city in Africa)	80.97	78.48	83.58	5.10	−1.22	79.75	2.61	82.36	80.37	84.40	4.03	1.39
Spain	Ceuta (autonomous city in Africa)	80.97	78.68	83.38	4.70	−2.21	78.76	2.29	81.05	79.26	82.79	3.53	0.08
France	Réunion (in the Indian Ocean)	80.92	77.18	84.59	7.41	−0.02	80.90	−0.13	80.77	77.64	83.78	6.14	−0.15
France	Mayotte (in the Indian Ocean)	75.55	75.19	75.93	0.74	−4.05	71.50	3.52	75.02	74.81	75.01	0.20	−0.53
Portugal	Madeira (in the Atlantic Ocean)	78.61	75.02	81.74	6.72	0.57	79.18	0.58	79.76	76.61	82.59	5.98	1.15
Algeria	Nord Ouest (Oran, Tlemcen, Mostaganem, Ain Temouchent, Relizane, Sidi Bel Abbes, Mascara)	77.80	76.49	79.32	2.83	−0.10	77.70	0.77	78.47	77.11	80.03	2.92	0.67
Algeria	Nord Centre (Alger, Blida, Boumerdes, Tipaza, Bouira, Medea, Tizi-Ouzou, Bejaia, Chlef, Ain Defla)	77.52	76.22	78.99	2.77	−0.10	77.42	0.76	78.18	76.84	79.69	2.85	0.66
Algeria	Hauts Plateaux Ouest (Tiaret, Saida, Tissemsilt, Naama, El Bayadh)	76.74	75.49	78.07	2.58	−0.10	76.64	0.76	77.40	76.11	78.77	2.66	0.66
Algeria	Hauts Plateaux Est (Setif, Batna, Khenchela, Bou Arreridj, Oum El Bouaghi, Tebessa)	76.08	74.86	77.29	2.43	−0.10	75.98	0.75	76.73	75.47	77.98	2.51	0.65
Algeria	Hauts Plateaux Centre (Djelfa, Laghouat, MSila)	76.01	74.80	77.21	2.41	−0.10	75.91	0.75	76.66	75.41	77.91	2.50	0.65
Algeria	Sud (Bechar, Tindouf, Adrar, Ghardaia, Biskra, El Oued, Ouargla, Tamanrasset, Illizi)	75.55	74.36	76.67	2.31	−0.10	75.45	0.75	76.20	74.97	77.36	2.39	0.65
Algeria	Nord Est (Annaba, Constantine, Skikda, Jijel, Mila, Souk Ahras, El Tarf, Guelma)	73.82	72.71	74.62	1.91	−0.09	73.73	0.72	74.45	73.30	75.29	1.99	0.63
Morocco	Centre	75.51	73.45	77.95	4.50	−0.24	75.27	0.95	76.22	74.11	78.69	4.58	0.71
Morocco	Tensift	74.91	72.87	77.22	4.35	−0.23	74.68	0.94	75.62	73.52	77.96	4.44	0.71
Morocco	Eastern	74.53	72.50	76.76	4.26	−0.23	74.30	0.94	75.24	73.15	77.50	4.35	0.71
Morocco	North west	74.45	72.42	76.66	4.24	−0.23	74.22	0.93	75.15	73.07	77.40	4.33	0.70
Morocco	Centre north	73.65	71.64	75.69	4.05	−0.23	73.42	0.93	74.35	72.28	76.41	4.13	0.70
Morocco	Centre south	73.14	71.13	75.06	3.93	−0.23	72.91	0.92	73.83	71.77	75.78	4.01	0.69
Morocco	South (Note: Statistics for the South region of Morocco includes statistics for Western Sahara, which is a disputed territory. De facto, 70% of Western Sahara is controlled by Morocco, 30% is controlled by a partially recognized state SADR.)	72.43	70.43	74.20	3.77	−0.22	72.21	0.91	73.12	71.07	74.91	3.84	0.69
Tunisia	Grand Tunis (Tunis, Ariana, Ben Arous, Manouba)	77.31	74.11	80.97	6.86	−2.26	75.05	0.50	75.55	72.55	78.96	6.41	−1.76
Tunisia	Sud Est (Gabes, Medinine, Tataouine)	76.69	73.54	80.22	6.68	−2.24	74.45	0.49	74.94	71.99	78.23	6.24	−1.75
Tunisia	Centre Est (Sousse, Monastir, Mahdia, Sfax)	75.99	72.90	79.38	6.48	−2.22	73.77	0.49	74.26	71.37	77.41	6.04	−1.73
Tunisia	Nord Ouest (Beja, Jendouba, Kef, Siliana)	74.82	71.81	77.96	6.15	−2.19	72.63	0.49	73.12	70.31	76.03	5.72	−1.70
Tunisia	Nord Est (Nabeul, Zaghouan, Bizerte)	74.49	71.51	77.57	6.06	−2.17	72.32	0.48	72.80	70.01	75.64	5.63	−1.69
Tunisia	Sud Ouest (Gafsa, Tozeur, Kebili)	74.39	71.41	77.44	6.03	−2.18	72.21	0.48	72.69	69.91	75.51	5.60	−1.70
Tunisia	Centre Ouest (Kairouan, Kasserine, Sidi Bouzid)	72.57	69.71	75.23	5.52	−2.12	70.45	0.47	70.92	68.25	73.36	5.11	−1.65
Cape Verde	—	76.00	71.57	80.18	8.61	−1.95	74.05	0.67	74.72	70.29	79.01	8.72	−1.28
Mauritius	—	75.12	72.18	78.18	6.00	−1.56	73.56	0.42	73.98	70.96	77.13	6.17	−1.14
Eritrea	Maekel	74.71	—	—	—	−0.85	73.86	0.08	73.94	71.63	77.45	5.82	−0.77
Eritrea	Anseba	72.51	—	—	—	−0.82	71.69	0.07	71.76	69.56	74.89	5.33	−0.75
Eritrea	Debub	66.76	—	—	—	−0.76	66.00	0.07	66.07	63.91	68.02	4.11	−0.69
Eritrea	Gash-Barka	65.19	—	—	—	−0.74	64.45	0.07	64.52	62.29	66.09	3.80	−0.67
Eritrea	Semenawi Keih Bahri	61.75	—	—	—	−0.70	61.05	0.06	61.11	58.55	61.72	3.17	−0.64
Eritrea	Debubawi Keih Bahri	58.79	—	—	—	−0.67	58.12	0.06	58.18	54.96	57.70	2.74	−0.61
Egypt	Damietta	73.82	71.35	76.66	5.31	−1.18	72.64	−0.06	72.58	70.13	75.46	5.33	−1.24
Egypt	Cairo	73.62	71.17	76.43	5.26	−1.17	72.45	−0.07	72.38	69.95	75.23	5.28	−1.24
Egypt	Menoufia	73.62	71.16	76.42	5.26	−1.18	72.44	−0.06	72.38	69.95	75.22	5.27	−1.24
Egypt	Behera	73.18	70.76	75.90	5.14	−1.17	72.01	−0.06	71.95	69.55	74.71	5.16	−1.23
Egypt	Suez	72.82	70.42	75.47	5.05	−1.16	71.66	−0.06	71.60	69.22	74.29	5.07	−1.22
Egypt	Port Said	72.76	70.36	75.39	5.03	−1.16	71.60	−0.06	71.54	69.16	74.21	5.05	−1.22
Egypt	Dakahlia	72.65	70.26	75.26	5.00	−1.16	71.49	−0.06	71.43	69.06	74.08	5.02	−1.22
Egypt	Kafr El-Sheikh	72.63	70.24	75.24	5.00	−1.16	71.47	−0.06	71.41	69.04	74.06	5.02	−1.22
Egypt	Giza	72.24	69.88	74.78	4.90	−1.15	71.09	−0.06	71.03	68.69	73.61	4.92	−1.21
Egypt	Fayoum	72.22	69.86	74.75	4.89	−1.15	71.07	−0.06	71.01	68.66	73.58	4.92	−1.21
Egypt	Frontier governorates (Red Sea, New Valley, Matroh, North Sainai, South Sainai)	72.15	69.79	74.66	4.87	−1.15	71.00	−0.07	70.93	68.60	73.49	4.89	−1.22
Egypt	Alexandria	71.94	69.60	74.41	4.81	−1.15	70.79	−0.06	70.73	68.41	73.25	4.84	−1.21
Egypt	Gharbia	71.52	69.20	73.91	4.71	−1.14	70.38	−0.06	70.32	68.02	72.75	4.73	−1.20
Egypt	Aswan	70.65	68.38	72.86	4.48	−1.13	69.52	−0.06	69.46	67.21	71.71	4.50	−1.19
Egypt	Sharkia	70.56	68.29	72.74	4.45	−1.13	69.43	−0.06	69.37	67.12	71.61	4.49	−1.19
Egypt	Ismailia	70.17	67.92	72.27	4.35	−1.12	69.05	−0.06	68.99	66.76	71.14	4.38	−1.18
Egypt	Kalyubia	70.05	67.81	72.14	4.33	−1.11	68.94	−0.06	68.88	66.66	71.01	4.35	−1.17
Egypt	Qena	69.83	67.61	71.87	4.26	−1.11	68.72	−0.06	68.66	66.45	70.75	4.30	−1.17
Egypt	Menya	69.49	67.27	71.45	4.18	−1.11	68.38	−0.06	68.32	66.12	70.33	4.21	−1.17
Egypt	Beni Suef	69.36	67.16	71.30	4.14	−1.10	68.26	−0.06	68.20	66.01	70.19	4.18	−1.16
Egypt	Souhag	68.75	66.57	70.55	3.98	−1.10	67.65	−0.06	67.59	65.43	69.45	4.02	−1.16
Egypt	Assuit	68.26	66.10	69.96	3.86	−1.09	67.17	−0.06	67.11	64.97	68.86	3.89	−1.15
Ethiopia	Addis Ababa	72.75	69.45	77.04	7.59	−0.96	71.79	0.74	72.53	68.97	77.16	8.19	−0.22
Ethiopia	Tigray Region	69.35	66.35	73.02	6.67	−0.91	68.44	0.71	69.15	65.89	73.13	7.24	−0.20
Ethiopia	Harari Region	67.19	64.34	70.43	6.09	−0.88	66.31	0.68	66.99	63.89	70.54	6.65	−0.20
Ethiopia	Oromia Region	66.25	63.45	69.30	5.85	−0.87	65.38	0.68	66.06	63.01	69.41	6.40	−0.19
Ethiopia	Amhara Region	65.31	62.55	68.16	5.61	−0.85	64.46	0.66	65.12	62.11	68.26	6.15	−0.19
Ethiopia	Gambela Region	64.91	62.16	67.66	5.50	−0.85	64.06	0.66	64.72	61.72	67.77	6.05	−0.19
Ethiopia	South Ethiopia Regional State	64.87	62.12	67.61	5.49	−0.85	64.02	0.66	64.68	61.69	67.72	6.03	−0.19
Ethiopia	Dire Dawa	64.26	61.53	66.87	5.34	−0.84	63.42	0.65	64.07	61.10	66.97	5.87	−0.19
Ethiopia	Somali Region	64.07	61.34	66.63	5.29	−0.84	63.23	0.65	63.88	60.91	66.74	5.83	−0.19
Ethiopia	Benishangul-Gumuz Region	63.58	60.86	66.03	5.17	−0.83	62.75	0.64	63.39	60.44	66.13	5.69	−0.19
Ethiopia	Affar	60.22	57.47	61.82	4.35	−0.79	59.43	0.62	60.05	57.07	61.91	4.84	−0.17
Libya	—	72.46	69.50	75.77	6.27	−0.55	71.91	0.24	72.15	69.74	74.76	5.02	−0.31
Tanzania	Arusha, Manyara	72.31	69.92	75.38	5.46	−0.85	71.46	0.62	72.08	69.71	75.18	5.47	−0.23
Tanzania	Zanzibar South	71.53	69.21	74.48	5.27	−0.84	70.69	0.62	71.31	69.00	74.28	5.28	−0.22
Tanzania	Kilimanjaro	71.52	69.19	74.46	5.27	−0.85	70.67	0.62	71.29	68.98	74.25	5.27	−0.23
Tanzania	Singida	71.41	69.09	74.33	5.24	−0.84	70.57	0.62	71.19	68.88	74.13	5.25	−0.22
Tanzania	Pemba South	71.16	68.86	74.04	5.18	−0.84	70.32	0.62	70.94	68.65	73.84	5.19	−0.22
Tanzania	Zanzibar West	70.41	68.16	73.16	5.00	−0.83	69.58	0.61	70.19	67.95	72.97	5.02	−0.22
Tanzania	Pemba North	70.35	68.11	73.10	4.99	−0.82	69.53	0.61	70.14	67.90	72.90	5.00	−0.21
Tanzania	Zanzibar North	69.52	67.33	72.12	4.79	−0.82	68.70	0.60	69.30	67.12	71.92	4.80	−0.22
Tanzania	Tanga	69.12	66.96	71.65	4.69	−0.81	68.31	0.60	68.91	66.75	71.46	4.71	−0.21
Tanzania	Iringa, Njombe	69.12	66.95	71.64	4.69	−0.82	68.30	0.60	68.90	66.74	71.45	4.71	−0.22
Tanzania	Kigoma	68.88	66.72	71.36	4.64	−0.81	68.07	0.59	68.66	66.52	71.17	4.65	−0.22
Tanzania	Morogoro	68.79	66.64	71.26	4.62	−0.81	67.98	0.60	68.58	66.43	71.06	4.63	−0.21
Tanzania	Ruvuma	68.73	66.58	71.18	4.60	−0.81	67.92	0.59	68.51	66.37	70.99	4.62	−0.22
Tanzania	Tabora	67.91	65.80	70.21	4.41	−0.80	67.11	0.59	67.70	65.60	70.02	4.42	−0.21
Tanzania	Lindi	66.84	64.78	68.94	4.16	−0.78	66.06	0.58	66.64	64.58	68.76	4.18	−0.20
Tanzania	Mtwara	66.82	64.76	68.92	4.16	−0.78	66.04	0.58	66.62	64.56	68.73	4.17	−0.20
Tanzania	Mwanza, Geita	66.03	64.00	67.97	3.97	−0.77	65.26	0.57	65.83	63.80	67.79	3.99	−0.20
Tanzania	Kagera	65.56	63.53	67.40	3.87	−0.77	64.79	0.57	65.36	63.34	67.22	3.88	−0.20
Tanzania	Shinyanga, Simiyu	65.35	63.33	67.15	3.82	−0.77	64.58	0.57	65.15	63.14	66.97	3.83	−0.20
Tanzania	Pwani	65.21	63.19	66.98	3.79	−0.76	64.45	0.56	65.01	63.00	66.80	3.80	−0.20
Tanzania	Mara	64.73	62.71	66.39	3.68	−0.77	63.96	0.57	64.53	62.52	66.22	3.70	−0.20
Tanzania	Dar es Salaam	64.67	62.66	66.33	3.67	−0.76	63.91	0.56	64.47	62.47	66.15	3.68	−0.20
Tanzania	Mbeya	64.57	62.56	66.21	3.65	−0.76	63.81	0.56	64.37	62.36	66.03	3.67	−0.20
Tanzania	Rukwa, Katavi	64.40	62.39	66.00	3.61	−0.76	63.64	0.56	64.20	62.20	65.82	3.62	−0.20
Tanzania	Dodoma	64.14	62.13	65.68	3.55	−0.75	63.39	0.55	63.94	61.94	65.51	3.57	−0.20
Sudan	Nahr El Nil	71.64	68.79	75.18	6.39	−0.66	70.98	0.34	71.32	68.37	74.95	6.58	−0.32
Sudan	Northern	71.46	68.62	74.96	6.34	−0.66	70.80	0.33	71.13	68.20	74.74	6.54	−0.33
Sudan	Khartoum	68.20	65.62	71.15	5.53	−0.63	67.57	0.32	67.89	65.22	70.93	5.71	−0.31
Sudan	Kassala	68.13	65.55	71.06	5.51	−0.63	67.50	0.32	67.82	65.15	70.85	5.70	−0.31
Sudan	Red Sea	68.06	65.49	70.98	5.49	−0.63	67.43	0.32	67.75	65.09	70.77	5.68	−0.31
Sudan	Al Gezira	68.03	65.46	70.95	5.49	−0.63	67.40	0.32	67.72	65.07	70.73	5.66	−0.31
Sudan	North Kordofan	67.98	65.41	70.88	5.47	−0.63	67.35	0.32	67.67	65.01	70.67	5.66	−0.31
Sudan	Sinnar	67.85	65.30	70.74	5.44	−0.62	67.23	0.32	67.55	64.90	70.53	5.63	−0.30
Sudan	Al Gedarif	65.48	63.06	67.92	4.86	−0.60	64.88	0.31	65.19	62.68	67.72	5.04	−0.29
Sudan	White Nile	65.29	62.88	67.69	4.81	−0.60	64.69	0.31	65.00	62.50	67.49	4.99	−0.29
Sudan	South Kordofan	65.14	62.73	67.50	4.77	−0.60	64.54	0.30	64.84	62.35	67.30	4.95	−0.30
Sudan	West Darfur	64.35	61.97	66.56	4.59	−0.59	63.76	0.30	64.06	61.60	66.36	4.76	−0.29
Sudan	South Darfur	63.65	61.29	65.71	4.42	−0.59	63.06	0.30	63.36	60.92	65.51	4.59	−0.29
Sudan	North Darfur	63.40	61.04	65.40	4.36	−0.59	62.81	0.30	63.11	60.67	65.21	4.54	−0.29
Sudan	Blue Nile	61.00	58.66	62.47	3.81	−0.56	60.44	0.29	60.73	58.30	62.28	3.98	−0.27
Somalia	Hiran	70.92	72.51	80.72	8.21	0.00	70.92	0.00	70.92	71.13	79.55	8.42	0.00
Somalia	Awdal	69.90	71.52	79.44	7.92	0.00	69.90	0.00	69.90	70.16	78.29	8.13	0.00
Somalia	Sanaag	64.62	66.30	72.78	6.48	0.00	64.62	0.00	64.62	65.04	71.72	6.68	0.00
Somalia	Sool	61.09	62.65	68.21	5.56	0.00	61.09	0.00	61.09	61.46	67.22	5.76	0.00
Somalia	Middle Juba	60.24	61.75	67.09	5.34	0.00	60.24	0.00	60.24	60.57	66.11	5.54	0.00
Somalia	Bari	59.44	60.89	66.03	5.14	0.00	59.44	0.00	59.44	59.73	65.07	5.34	0.00
Somalia	Mudug	58.49	59.85	64.75	4.90	0.00	58.49	0.00	58.49	58.71	63.81	5.10	0.00
Somalia	Nugal	57.68	58.96	63.67	4.71	0.00	57.68	0.00	57.68	57.83	62.74	4.91	0.00
Somalia	Middle Shabelle	57.63	58.90	63.60	4.70	0.00	57.63	0.00	57.63	57.78	62.67	4.89	0.00
Somalia	W Galbeed	56.09	57.14	61.48	4.34	0.00	56.09	0.00	56.09	56.05	60.59	4.54	0.00
Somalia	Gedo	55.51	56.45	60.66	4.21	0.00	55.51	0.00	55.51	55.38	59.78	4.40	0.00
Somalia	Galguduud	54.60	55.36	59.38	4.02	0.00	54.60	0.00	54.60	54.31	58.51	4.20	0.00
Somalia	Bakool	54.25	54.94	58.88	3.94	0.00	54.25	0.00	54.25	53.89	58.02	4.13	0.00
Somalia	Togdhere	53.37	53.83	57.59	3.76	0.00	53.37	0.00	53.37	52.81	56.76	3.95	0.00
Somalia	Banadir	51.99	51.96	55.48	3.52	0.00	51.99	0.00	51.99	50.97	54.67	3.70	0.00
Somalia	Bay	51.56	51.34	54.79	3.45	0.00	51.56	0.00	51.56	50.36	53.99	3.63	0.00
Somalia	Lower Juba	50.15	49.03	52.34	3.31	0.00	50.15	0.00	50.15	48.10	51.58	3.48	0.00
Somalia	Lower Shabelle	49.95	48.64	51.95	3.31	0.00	49.95	0.00	49.95	47.71	51.19	3.48	0.00
Senegal	Dakar	71.38	68.59	74.38	5.79	−1.49	69.89	0.85	70.74	68.10	73.59	5.49	−0.64
Senegal	Thiès	71.17	68.40	74.13	5.73	−1.49	69.68	0.85	70.53	67.91	73.34	5.43	−0.64
Senegal	Fatick	68.93	66.32	71.44	5.12	−1.45	67.48	0.83	68.31	65.84	70.68	4.84	−0.62
Senegal	Saint-Louis	68.82	66.22	71.31	5.09	−1.44	67.38	0.82	68.20	65.74	70.55	4.81	−0.62
Senegal	Ziguinchor	68.64	66.06	71.09	5.03	−1.43	67.21	0.82	68.03	65.58	70.34	4.76	−0.61
Senegal	Kaolack	68.51	65.94	70.94	5.00	−1.43	67.08	0.82	67.90	65.46	70.18	4.72	−0.61
Senegal	Diourbel	68.39	65.82	70.79	4.97	−1.43	66.96	0.82	67.78	65.35	70.04	4.69	−0.61
Senegal	Tambacounda	67.10	64.60	69.22	4.62	−1.41	65.69	0.81	66.50	64.14	68.48	4.34	−0.60
Senegal	Louga	66.14	63.68	68.04	4.36	−1.39	64.75	0.79	65.54	63.23	67.32	4.09	−0.60
Senegal	Kolda	62.74	60.38	63.85	3.47	−1.31	61.43	0.75	62.18	59.94	63.17	3.23	−0.56
Madagascar	Diana	70.59	68.03	73.74	5.71	−0.67	69.92	0.81	70.73	68.04	74.09	6.05	0.14
Madagascar	Sava	71.27	68.65	74.54	5.89	−2.62	68.65	0.80	69.45	66.88	72.59	5.71	−1.82
Madagascar	Ihorombe	65.61	63.37	67.86	4.49	2.40	68.01	0.78	68.79	66.28	71.83	5.55	3.18
Madagascar	Analamanga	69.63	67.15	72.62	5.47	−2.30	67.33	0.77	68.10	65.65	71.02	5.37	−1.53
Madagascar	Itasy	68.31	65.93	71.08	5.15	−0.99	67.32	0.78	68.10	65.65	71.02	5.37	−0.21
Madagascar	Androy	64.49	62.30	66.52	4.22	2.24	66.73	0.77	67.50	65.09	70.31	5.22	3.01
Madagascar	Alaotra-Mangoro	67.99	65.64	70.70	5.06	−2.13	65.86	0.76	66.62	64.27	69.27	5.00	−1.37
Madagascar	Boeny	68.71	66.30	71.55	5.25	−2.91	65.80	0.76	66.56	64.21	69.19	4.98	−2.15
Madagascar	Matsiatra Ambony	66.29	64.04	68.69	4.65	−1.64	64.65	0.74	65.39	63.12	67.81	4.69	−0.90
Madagascar	Vakinankaratra	66.52	64.26	68.96	4.70	−2.29	64.23	0.74	64.97	62.72	67.30	4.58	−1.55
Madagascar	Sofia	66.24	64.00	68.63	4.63	−2.12	64.12	0.74	64.86	62.62	67.18	4.56	−1.38
Madagascar	Atsinanana	65.06	62.88	67.23	4.35	−0.95	64.11	0.74	64.85	62.61	67.16	4.55	−0.21
Madagascar	Atsimo-Atsinanana	61.50	59.37	62.89	3.52	2.33	63.83	0.73	64.56	62.34	66.82	4.48	3.06
Madagascar	Menabe	62.82	60.71	64.52	3.81	0.67	63.49	0.73	64.22	62.01	66.41	4.40	1.40
Madagascar	Anosy	64.14	62.00	66.13	4.13	−0.79	63.35	0.73	64.08	61.88	66.24	4.36	−0.06
Madagascar	Analanjirofo	66.28	64.03	68.67	4.64	−3.03	63.25	0.73	63.98	61.79	66.12	4.33	−2.30
Madagascar	Amoron'i Mania	68.21	65.80	70.93	5.13	−5.40	62.81	0.72	63.53	61.35	65.58	4.23	−4.68
Madagascar	Betsiboka	61.23	59.12	62.57	3.45	1.36	62.59	0.72	63.31	61.14	65.31	4.17	2.08
Madagascar	Melaky	67.61	65.25	70.23	4.98	−5.20	62.41	0.72	63.13	60.96	65.09	4.13	−4.48
Madagascar	Bongolava	63.92	61.78	65.86	4.08	−1.55	62.37	0.72	63.09	60.93	65.04	4.11	−0.83
Madagascar	Atsimo Andrefana	64.08	61.94	66.06	4.12	−2.34	61.74	0.71	62.45	60.31	64.27	3.96	−1.63
Madagascar	Vatovavy Fitovinany	62.51	60.38	64.14	3.76	−4.39	58.12	0.67	58.79	56.65	59.76	3.11	−3.72
Rwanda	City of Kigali	69.64	67.22	72.37	5.15	−0.53	69.11	1.10	70.21	67.72	72.98	5.26	0.57
Rwanda	Western Province	67.34	65.04	69.58	4.54	−0.33	67.01	1.08	68.09	65.72	70.41	4.69	0.75
Rwanda	Southern Province	65.74	63.51	67.63	4.12	−0.58	65.16	1.05	66.21	63.93	68.12	4.19	0.47
Rwanda	Eastern Province	65.17	62.95	66.92	3.97	−0.02	65.15	1.04	66.19	63.91	68.10	4.19	1.02
Rwanda	Northern Province	65.80	63.57	67.71	4.14	−0.75	65.05	1.04	66.09	63.81	67.97	4.16	0.29
Sao Tome and Principe	Regiao Centro	69.57	66.78	72.86	6.08	−0.95	68.62	1.22	69.84	67.01	73.18	6.17	0.27
Sao Tome and Principe	Regiao do Principe	68.42	65.74	71.50	5.76	−0.93	67.49	1.20	68.69	65.96	71.81	5.85	0.27
Sao Tome and Principe	Regiao Sul	67.76	65.14	70.71	5.57	−0.92	66.84	1.19	68.03	65.36	71.03	5.67	0.27
Sao Tome and Principe	Regiao Norte	66.70	64.16	69.44	5.28	−0.90	65.80	1.17	66.97	64.38	69.75	5.37	0.27
Niger	Agadez	70.47	72.04	74.73	2.69	−1.48	68.99	0.57	69.56	70.81	74.10	3.29	−0.91
Niger	Diffa	70.47	72.04	74.73	2.69	−1.48	68.99	0.57	69.56	70.81	74.10	3.29	−0.91
Niger	Tahoua	64.20	63.43	65.77	2.34	−1.35	62.85	0.52	63.37	62.35	65.22	2.87	−0.83
Niger	Tillabery (inc. Niamey)	63.78	62.93	65.18	2.25	−1.34	62.44	0.51	62.95	61.86	64.64	2.78	−0.83
Niger	Zinder	62.19	61.00	62.93	1.93	−1.30	60.89	0.49	61.38	59.96	62.40	2.44	−0.81
Niger	Maradi	61.72	60.39	62.24	1.85	−1.30	60.42	0.50	60.92	59.37	61.71	2.34	−0.80
Niger	Dosso	59.77	57.76	59.27	1.51	−1.26	58.51	0.48	58.99	56.78	58.78	2.00	−0.78
Angola	Bengo	70.12	67.13	73.96	6.83	−0.90	69.22	0.32	69.54	66.43	73.53	7.10	−0.58
Angola	Cabinda	67.88	65.08	71.35	6.27	−0.88	67.00	0.31	67.31	64.40	70.93	6.53	−0.57
Angola	Lunda Sul	67.50	64.74	70.91	6.17	−0.87	66.63	0.31	66.94	64.06	70.50	6.44	−0.56
Angola	Luanda	67.10	64.37	70.44	6.07	−0.86	66.24	0.31	66.55	63.70	70.03	6.33	−0.55
Angola	Zaire	66.19	63.52	69.37	5.85	−0.85	65.34	0.30	65.64	62.86	68.97	6.11	−0.55
Angola	Malange	65.79	63.15	68.90	5.75	−0.84	64.95	0.30	65.25	62.49	68.50	6.01	−0.54
Angola	Lunda Norte	65.11	62.50	68.09	5.59	−0.84	64.27	0.29	64.56	61.85	67.69	5.84	−0.55
Angola	Cunene	63.52	61.00	66.20	5.20	−0.82	62.70	0.29	62.99	60.36	65.81	5.45	−0.53
Angola	Kuando Kubango	63.47	60.96	66.15	5.19	−0.81	62.66	0.29	62.95	60.32	65.76	5.44	−0.52
Angola	Uige	63.41	60.90	66.07	5.17	−0.82	62.59	0.29	62.88	60.26	65.69	5.43	−0.53
Angola	Bie	62.40	59.93	64.86	4.93	−0.81	61.59	0.29	61.88	59.30	64.48	5.18	−0.52
Angola	Moxico	61.64	59.00	64.33	5.33	−0.80	60.84	0.29	61.13	58.39	63.95	5.56	−0.51
Angola	Kuanza Norte	61.34	58.91	63.59	4.68	−0.79	60.55	0.28	60.83	58.29	63.22	4.93	−0.51
Angola	Namibe	60.91	58.49	63.07	4.58	−0.78	60.13	0.28	60.41	57.88	62.70	4.82	−0.50
Angola	Huambo	60.44	58.03	62.50	4.47	−0.78	59.66	0.28	59.94	57.42	62.13	4.71	−0.50
Angola	Huila	57.90	55.48	59.37	3.89	−0.75	57.15	0.27	57.42	54.90	59.02	4.12	−0.48
Angola	Kuanza Sul	56.11	53.62	57.13	3.51	−0.72	55.39	0.25	55.64	53.06	56.79	3.73	−0.47
Angola	Benguela	55.10	52.54	55.84	3.30	−0.71	54.39	0.25	54.64	51.99	55.51	3.52	−0.46
Djibouti	Other Districts	69.40	—	—	—	−0.86	68.54	0.61	69.15	66.36	73.07	6.71	−0.25
Djibouti	Djibouti	62.01	—	—	—	−0.77	61.24	0.54	61.78	59.26	64.18	4.92	−0.23
Zambia	North-Western	69.33	66.06	73.04	6.98	−1.73	67.60	0.64	68.24	64.94	72.03	7.09	−1.09
Zambia	Central	65.59	62.68	68.70	6.02	−1.64	63.95	0.61	64.56	61.61	67.76	6.15	−1.03
Zambia	Copperbelt	65.18	62.30	68.22	5.92	−1.63	63.55	0.61	64.16	61.24	67.28	6.04	−1.02
Zambia	Western	63.89	61.11	66.71	5.60	−1.59	62.30	0.59	62.89	60.07	65.79	5.72	−1.00
Zambia	Lusaka	62.85	60.13	65.48	5.35	−1.57	61.28	0.58	61.86	59.11	64.58	5.47	−0.99
Zambia	Eastern	62.84	60.13	65.47	5.34	−1.57	61.27	0.58	61.85	59.10	64.57	5.47	−0.99
Zambia	Northern	62.00	59.33	64.47	5.14	−1.55	60.45	0.57	61.02	58.32	63.58	5.26	−0.98
Zambia	Southern	61.88	59.22	64.32	5.10	−1.55	60.33	0.57	60.90	58.21	63.44	5.23	−0.98
Zambia	Luapula	56.33	53.81	57.61	3.80	−1.40	54.93	0.52	55.45	52.90	56.82	3.92	−0.88
Congo, Rep.	Pointe-Noire	67.77	66.14	70.16	4.02	0.84	68.61	−0.51	68.10	66.32	70.66	4.34	0.33
Congo, Rep.	Plateaux	64.59	63.13	66.38	3.25	0.80	65.39	−0.48	64.91	63.30	66.85	3.55	0.32
Congo, Rep.	Cuvette	64.21	62.76	65.92	3.16	0.79	65.00	−0.48	64.52	62.93	66.39	3.46	0.31
Congo, Rep.	Niari	63.84	62.41	65.48	3.07	0.79	64.63	−0.48	64.15	62.58	65.95	3.37	0.31
Congo, Rep.	Brazzaville	63.49	62.06	65.06	3.00	0.78	64.27	−0.47	63.80	62.23	65.51	3.28	0.31
Congo, Rep.	Bouenza	60.10	58.75	60.95	2.20	0.74	60.84	−0.44	60.40	58.91	61.38	2.47	0.30
Congo, Rep.	Likouala	59.06	57.69	59.66	1.97	0.72	59.78	−0.44	59.34	57.85	60.08	2.23	0.28
Congo, Rep.	Kouilou	59.04	57.68	59.65	1.97	0.73	59.77	−0.44	59.33	57.84	60.07	2.23	0.29
Congo, Rep.	Lékoumou	58.62	57.25	59.13	1.88	0.72	59.34	−0.43	58.91	57.41	59.54	2.13	0.29
Congo, Rep.	Pool	58.25	56.87	58.66	1.79	0.71	58.96	−0.43	58.53	57.03	59.08	2.05	0.28
Congo, Rep.	Cuvette-Ouest	57.37	55.97	57.57	1.60	0.71	58.08	−0.43	57.65	56.13	57.98	1.85	0.28
Congo, Rep.	Sangha	54.45	52.88	53.86	0.98	0.67	55.12	−0.41	54.71	53.02	54.24	1.22	0.26
Mauritania	Tiris-Zemmour	66.83	65.67	69.61	3.94	0.58	67.41	0.34	67.75	65.81	70.07	4.26	0.92
Mauritania	Trarza incl Nouakchott	66.94	65.47	69.53	4.06	−0.04	66.90	0.34	67.24	65.34	69.48	4.14	0.30
Mauritania	Nouadhibou	65.37	63.93	67.59	3.66	−0.38	64.99	0.33	65.32	63.55	67.19	3.64	−0.05
Mauritania	Brakna	64.74	63.31	66.81	3.50	−0.50	64.24	0.33	64.57	62.85	66.30	3.45	−0.17
Mauritania	Guidimagha	65.05	63.40	67.04	3.64	−0.91	64.14	0.33	64.47	62.75	66.18	3.43	−0.58
Mauritania	Hodh Ech Chargui	65.12	63.21	66.94	3.73	−1.46	63.66	0.33	63.99	62.30	65.61	3.31	−1.13
Mauritania	Hodh Gharbi	64.13	66.18	68.52	2.34	−0.60	63.53	0.32	63.85	62.17	65.44	3.27	−0.28
Mauritania	Gorgol	63.45	65.46	67.65	2.19	−0.26	63.19	0.32	63.51	61.85	65.03	3.18	0.06
Mauritania	Assaba	63.35	65.39	67.54	2.15	−0.43	62.92	0.31	63.23	61.59	64.70	3.11	−0.12
Mauritania	Tagant	60.70	62.68	64.20	1.52	−0.82	59.88	0.30	60.18	58.64	61.00	2.36	−0.52
Mauritania	Inchiri	59.59	58.85	60.88	2.03	−0.17	59.42	0.31	59.73	58.18	60.44	2.26	0.14
Mauritania	Adrar	61.09	59.08	61.84	2.76	−2.33	58.76	0.30	59.06	57.52	59.62	2.10	−2.03
Ghana	Greater Accra	68.39	66.13	71.24	5.11	−1.00	67.39	0.16	67.55	65.20	70.50	5.30	−0.84
Ghana	Brong Ahafo	67.33	65.14	69.97	4.83	−0.98	66.35	0.16	66.51	64.23	69.24	5.01	−0.82
Ghana	Volta	66.46	64.32	68.92	4.60	−0.97	65.49	0.16	65.65	63.42	68.20	4.78	−0.81
Ghana	Western	66.35	64.22	68.79	4.57	−0.97	65.38	0.16	65.54	63.32	68.07	4.75	−0.81
Ghana	Eastern	65.38	63.30	67.60	4.30	−0.95	64.43	0.15	64.58	62.41	66.90	4.49	−0.80
Ghana	Upper East	65.19	63.12	67.37	4.25	−0.95	64.24	0.15	64.39	62.23	66.67	4.44	−0.80
Ghana	Central	65.05	62.98	67.20	4.22	−0.95	64.10	0.15	64.25	62.10	66.50	4.40	−0.80
Ghana	Ashanti	63.31	61.30	65.07	3.77	−0.93	62.38	0.15	62.53	60.44	64.39	3.95	−0.78
Ghana	Upper West	62.12	60.14	63.60	3.46	−0.91	61.21	0.14	61.35	59.29	62.94	3.65	−0.77
Ghana	Northern	61.37	59.40	62.67	3.27	−0.90	60.47	0.15	60.62	58.57	62.02	3.45	−0.75
Gabon	Ogooue Maritime	68.30	66.19	70.92	4.73	−0.68	67.62	−0.13	67.49	65.04	70.54	5.50	−0.81
Gabon	Moyen Ogooue	68.24	66.14	70.85	4.71	−1.46	66.78	−0.13	66.65	64.26	69.53	5.27	−1.59
Gabon	Estuaire	66.74	64.69	69.02	4.33	−0.19	66.55	−0.13	66.42	64.04	69.24	5.20	−0.32
Gabon	Haut Ogooue	66.28	64.28	68.47	4.19	−0.90	65.38	−0.12	65.26	62.95	67.83	4.88	−1.02
Gabon	Nyanga	65.85	63.87	67.96	4.09	−1.10	64.75	−0.13	64.62	62.35	67.05	4.70	−1.23
Gabon	Ngounie	65.13	63.16	67.06	3.90	−0.61	64.52	−0.13	64.39	62.13	66.77	4.64	−0.74
Gabon	Ogooue Lolo	65.31	63.35	67.30	3.95	−1.42	63.89	−0.12	63.77	61.54	66.01	4.47	−1.54
Gabon	Libreville	64.42	62.23	66.67	4.44	−1.63	62.79	−0.12	62.67	60.16	65.25	5.09	−1.75
Gabon	Woleu Ntem	63.31	61.41	64.84	3.43	−1.19	62.12	−0.12	62.00	59.83	63.83	4.00	−1.31
Gabon	Ogooue Ivindo	60.82	58.92	61.73	2.81	−0.69	60.13	−0.12	60.01	57.88	61.35	3.47	−0.81
Botswana	Kgatleng District	66.72	64.12	69.36	5.24	−4.41	62.31	4.86	67.17	64.52	69.88	5.36	0.45
Botswana	Kweneng District	66.48	63.89	69.08	5.19	−4.39	62.09	4.84	66.93	64.29	69.60	5.31	0.45
Botswana	North-East District	65.95	63.40	68.46	5.06	−4.35	61.60	4.80	66.40	63.79	68.98	5.19	0.45
Botswana	South-East District	65.55	63.01	67.99	4.98	−4.33	61.22	4.78	66.00	63.41	68.50	5.09	0.45
Botswana	Southern District	65.46	62.93	67.89	4.96	−4.32	61.14	4.77	65.91	63.33	68.40	5.07	0.45
Botswana	Central District	65.23	62.71	67.61	4.90	−4.31	60.92	4.76	65.68	63.10	68.12	5.02	0.45
Botswana	Ghanzi District	65.02	62.51	67.36	4.85	−4.30	60.72	4.74	65.46	62.90	67.87	4.97	0.44
Botswana	Kgalagadi District	64.78	62.28	67.08	4.80	−4.28	60.50	4.72	65.22	62.67	67.58	4.91	0.44
Botswana	North-West District, Ngamiland	63.98	61.51	66.14	4.63	−4.22	59.76	4.66	64.42	61.90	66.64	4.74	0.44
Botswana	Chobe	63.19	60.74	65.19	4.45	−4.18	59.01	4.61	63.62	61.12	65.68	4.56	0.43
Guinea	Conakry	67.96	66.76	71.12	4.36	−0.94	67.02	0.11	67.13	65.73	70.44	4.71	−0.83
Guinea	Mamou	61.97	60.87	63.69	2.82	−0.86	61.11	0.10	61.21	59.93	63.08	3.15	−0.76
Guinea	N Zerekore	61.57	60.46	63.18	2.72	−0.85	60.72	0.09	60.81	59.53	62.58	3.05	−0.76
Guinea	Labe	59.57	58.39	60.63	2.24	−0.82	58.75	0.09	58.84	57.49	60.05	2.56	−0.73
Guinea	Boke	58.05	56.76	58.64	1.88	−0.81	57.24	0.09	57.33	55.88	58.08	2.20	−0.72
Guinea	Faranah	58.04	56.75	58.63	1.88	−0.80	57.24	0.09	57.33	55.88	58.07	2.19	−0.71
Guinea	Kindia	57.88	56.57	58.42	1.85	−0.80	57.08	0.09	57.17	55.70	57.86	2.16	−0.71
Guinea	Kankan	56.90	55.48	57.11	1.63	−0.79	56.11	0.09	56.20	54.63	56.56	1.93	−0.70
Mali	Bamako	67.28	66.19	70.45	4.26	−0.82	66.46	0.54	67.00	65.68	70.44	4.76	−0.28
Mali	Gao and Kidal	64.12	63.10	66.53	3.43	−0.77	63.35	0.51	63.86	62.61	66.52	3.91	−0.26
Mali	Koulikoro	60.22	59.11	61.56	2.45	−0.73	59.49	0.48	59.97	58.65	61.55	2.90	−0.25
Mali	Sikasso	59.90	58.78	61.15	2.37	−0.72	59.18	0.48	59.66	58.32	61.14	2.82	−0.24
Mali	Mopti	57.87	56.58	58.48	1.90	−0.70	57.17	0.46	57.63	56.14	58.47	2.33	−0.24
Mali	Kayes	57.72	56.41	58.28	1.87	−0.70	57.02	0.46	57.48	55.98	58.27	2.29	−0.24
Mali	Tombouctou	57.70	56.39	58.25	1.86	−0.70	57.00	0.46	57.46	55.96	58.25	2.29	−0.24
Mali	Segou	57.41	56.07	57.87	1.80	−0.69	56.72	0.46	57.18	55.64	57.86	2.22	−0.23
Cameroon	Littoral (inc. Douala)	67.56	66.12	70.45	4.33	−1.37	66.19	0.69	66.88	65.25	69.96	4.71	−0.68
Cameroon	Northwest	66.07	64.67	68.61	3.94	−1.34	64.73	0.67	65.40	63.82	68.13	4.31	−0.67
Cameroon	Southwest	64.87	63.49	67.12	3.63	−1.32	63.55	0.66	64.21	62.65	66.66	4.01	−0.66
Cameroon	Centre (inc. Yaounde)	64.11	62.74	66.18	3.44	−1.30	62.81	0.65	63.46	61.91	65.72	3.81	−0.65
Cameroon	West	63.07	61.70	64.88	3.18	−1.28	61.79	0.64	62.43	60.89	64.43	3.54	−0.64
Cameroon	South	61.67	60.28	63.11	2.83	−1.25	60.42	0.63	61.05	59.48	62.67	3.19	−0.62
Cameroon	Adamaoua	60.74	59.31	61.92	2.61	−1.23	59.51	0.61	60.12	58.53	61.49	2.96	−0.62
Cameroon	Far North	60.10	58.65	61.10	2.45	−1.22	58.88	0.61	59.49	57.87	60.67	2.80	−0.61
Cameroon	East	57.81	56.20	58.12	1.92	−1.17	56.64	0.59	57.23	55.46	57.71	2.25	−0.58
Cameroon	North	56.68	54.95	56.62	1.67	−1.15	55.53	0.58	56.11	54.22	56.22	2.00	−0.57
Nigeria	Lagos	62.55	62.46	65.18	2.72	3.07	65.62	1.19	66.81	66.27	70.08	3.81	4.26
Nigeria	Ebonyi	59.41	59.33	61.32	1.99	4.69	64.10	1.17	65.27	64.82	68.25	3.43	5.86
Nigeria	Enugu	61.58	61.54	64.02	2.48	1.70	63.28	1.15	64.43	64.03	67.24	3.21	2.85
Nigeria	Abuja FCT	59.97	59.95	62.05	2.10	1.93	61.90	1.12	63.02	62.70	65.56	2.86	3.05
Nigeria	Anambra	60.97	60.96	63.29	2.33	−0.23	60.74	1.10	61.84	61.57	64.14	2.57	0.87
Nigeria	Imo	58.29	58.28	59.98	1.70	1.64	59.93	1.09	61.02	60.77	63.15	2.38	2.73
Nigeria	Kogi	54.34	53.97	54.85	0.88	5.58	59.92	1.09	61.01	60.76	63.13	2.37	6.67
Nigeria	Yobe	54.03	53.61	54.43	0.82	5.74	59.77	1.09	60.86	60.62	62.95	2.33	6.83
Nigeria	Benue	60.50	60.51	62.72	2.21	−0.97	59.53	1.08	60.61	60.37	62.65	2.28	0.11
Nigeria	Osun	59.43	59.43	61.40	1.97	−0.16	59.27	1.07	60.34	60.12	62.33	2.21	0.91
Nigeria	Kwara	59.09	59.10	60.99	1.89	0.09	59.18	1.08	60.26	60.03	62.22	2.19	1.17
Nigeria	Ondo	58.66	58.67	60.45	1.78	0.52	59.18	1.08	60.26	60.03	62.22	2.19	1.60
Nigeria	Adamawa	56.58	56.52	57.83	1.31	2.02	58.60	1.06	59.66	59.45	61.49	2.04	3.08
Nigeria	Niger	57.01	56.97	58.39	1.42	1.56	58.57	1.06	59.63	59.42	61.46	2.04	2.62
Nigeria	Oyo	59.68	59.69	61.71	2.02	−1.31	58.37	1.06	59.43	59.22	61.21	1.99	−0.25
Nigeria	Ekiti	57.16	57.13	58.57	1.44	1.19	58.35	1.06	59.41	59.20	61.19	1.99	2.25
Nigeria	Taraba	54.73	54.52	55.45	0.93	3.31	58.04	1.05	59.09	58.89	60.80	1.91	4.36
Nigeria	Akwa Ibom	56.63	56.59	57.91	1.32	0.96	57.59	1.05	58.64	58.44	60.24	1.80	2.01
Nigeria	Nassarawa	54.83	54.68	55.61	0.93	1.88	56.71	1.04	57.75	57.55	59.14	1.59	2.92
Nigeria	Abia	57.09	57.09	58.51	1.42	−0.81	56.28	1.02	57.30	57.10	58.59	1.49	0.21
Nigeria	Plateau	55.15	55.06	56.05	0.99	−0.25	54.90	1.00	55.90	55.67	56.85	1.18	0.75
Nigeria	Ogun	61.61	61.52	64.02	2.50	−6.90	54.71	1.00	55.71	55.47	56.60	1.13	−5.90
Nigeria	Gombe	50.65	49.77	49.93	0.16	3.95	54.60	0.99	55.59	55.35	56.46	1.11	4.94
Nigeria	Cross River	57.11	57.10	58.52	1.42	−2.55	54.56	0.99	55.55	55.31	56.41	1.10	−1.56
Nigeria	Delta	59.22	59.20	61.13	1.93	−4.93	54.29	0.99	55.28	55.03	56.06	1.03	−3.94
Nigeria	Edo	57.66	57.66	59.21	1.55	−3.45	54.21	0.98	55.19	54.94	55.95	1.01	−2.47
Nigeria	Borno	55.81	55.75	56.89	1.14	−3.40	52.41	0.95	53.36	53.00	53.62	0.62	−2.45
Nigeria	Bayelsa	60.36	60.18	62.42	2.24	−9.10	51.26	0.93	52.19	51.73	52.10	0.37	−8.17
Nigeria	Zamfora	52.03	51.68	52.02	0.34	−1.68	50.35	0.92	51.27	50.69	50.88	0.19	−0.76
Nigeria	Rivers	55.46	55.30	56.38	1.08	−5.58	49.88	0.91	50.79	50.15	50.24	0.09	−4.67
Nigeria	Kaduna	48.83	47.77	47.56	−0.21	0.31	49.14	0.90	50.04	49.26	49.22	−0.04	1.21
Nigeria	Katsina	48.59	47.49	47.23	−0.26	−0.02	48.57	0.88	49.45	48.55	48.41	−0.14	0.86
Nigeria	Bauchi	50.13	49.43	49.42	−0.01	−2.51	47.62	0.86	48.48	47.34	47.04	−0.30	−1.65
Nigeria	Kano	49.20	48.30	48.13	−0.17	−1.80	47.40	0.86	48.26	47.05	46.72	−0.33	−0.94
Nigeria	Sokoto	47.74	46.34	45.97	−0.37	−0.75	46.99	0.85	47.84	46.50	46.10	−0.40	0.10
Nigeria	Kebbi	46.32	43.80	43.42	−0.38	0.07	46.39	0.84	47.23	45.64	45.17	−0.47	0.91
Nigeria	Jigawa	47.04	45.28	44.85	−0.43	−0.70	46.34	0.84	47.18	45.57	45.10	−0.47	0.14
Sierra Leone	Bonthe	66.57	65.47	69.72	4.25	−0.21	66.36	0.39	66.75	65.66	69.88	4.22	0.18
Sierra Leone	Western Urban	64.06	62.95	66.53	3.58	−0.20	63.86	0.37	64.23	63.13	66.68	3.55	0.17
Sierra Leone	Kailahun	63.75	62.63	66.13	3.50	−0.20	63.55	0.37	63.92	62.81	66.28	3.47	0.17
Sierra Leone	Koinadugu	63.41	62.28	65.69	3.41	−0.20	63.21	0.36	63.57	62.46	65.83	3.37	0.16
Sierra Leone	Bombali	63.35	62.22	65.61	3.39	−0.20	63.15	0.37	63.52	62.40	65.76	3.36	0.17
Sierra Leone	Tonkolili	62.44	61.27	64.44	3.17	−0.20	62.24	0.37	62.61	61.46	64.58	3.12	0.17
Sierra Leone	Pujehun	62.03	60.84	63.89	3.05	−0.20	61.83	0.36	62.19	61.02	64.04	3.02	0.16
Sierra Leone	Kono	60.92	59.66	62.43	2.77	−0.20	60.72	0.36	61.08	59.83	62.58	2.75	0.16
Sierra Leone	Moyamba	59.19	57.77	60.12	2.35	−0.19	59.00	0.34	59.34	57.94	60.26	2.32	0.15
Sierra Leone	Bo	58.71	57.22	59.46	2.24	−0.19	58.52	0.34	58.86	57.39	59.60	2.21	0.15
Sierra Leone	Western Rural	58.48	56.97	59.16	2.19	−0.18	58.30	0.34	58.64	57.14	59.29	2.15	0.16
Sierra Leone	Kambia	58.35	56.82	58.98	2.16	−0.18	58.17	0.33	58.50	56.99	59.11	2.12	0.15
Sierra Leone	Kenema	56.97	55.19	57.05	1.86	−0.18	56.79	0.33	57.12	55.36	57.18	1.82	0.15
Sierra Leone	Port Loko	54.96	52.65	54.10	1.45	−0.17	54.79	0.31	55.10	52.80	54.23	1.43	0.14
Malawi	Kasungu	67.54	63.50	72.09	8.59	−0.86	66.68	0.00	66.68	63.01	70.85	7.84	−0.86
Malawi	Other northern (Chitipa, Karonga, Rumphi, Nkhata)	67.28	63.27	71.78	8.51	−0.86	66.42	−0.01	66.41	62.78	70.54	7.76	−0.87
Malawi	Lilongwe	64.51	60.75	68.43	7.68	−0.68	63.83	0.00	63.83	60.43	67.44	7.01	−0.68
Malawi	Mzimba	65.48	61.65	69.62	7.97	−1.87	63.61	−0.01	63.60	60.23	67.18	6.95	−1.88
Malawi	Mulanje	63.31	59.63	66.96	7.33	−0.25	63.06	−0.01	63.05	59.72	66.51	6.79	−0.26
Malawi	Machinga	63.91	60.21	67.71	7.50	−0.97	62.94	0.00	62.94	59.62	66.38	6.76	−0.97
Malawi	Zomba	64.84	61.06	68.84	7.78	−2.00	62.84	−0.01	62.83	59.52	66.25	6.73	−2.01
Malawi	Blantyre	64.29	60.56	68.17	7.61	−1.51	62.78	−0.01	62.77	59.46	66.17	6.71	−1.52
Malawi	Other central (Nkhota Kota, Mchinji, Dowa, Ntchisi, Dedza, Ntcheu)	63.67	59.99	67.42	7.43	−0.93	62.74	−0.01	62.73	59.42	66.12	6.70	−0.94
Malawi	Other southern (Balaka, Mwanza, Phalombe, Chiradzulu, Chikwawa, Nsanje, neno)	63.31	59.66	66.98	7.32	−1.41	61.90	0.00	61.90	58.65	65.11	6.46	−1.41
Malawi	Salima	63.00	59.37	66.60	7.23	−1.29	61.71	−0.01	61.70	58.47	64.88	6.41	−1.30
Malawi	Mangochi	62.68	59.06	66.20	7.14	−1.72	60.96	−0.01	60.95	57.77	63.96	6.19	−1.73
Malawi	Thyolo	62.11	58.51	65.50	6.99	−2.57	59.54	−0.01	59.53	56.41	62.21	5.80	−2.58
Mozambique	Inhambane	68.33	65.17	72.69	7.52	−2.06	66.27	0.34	66.61	63.18	71.28	8.10	−1.72
Mozambique	Nampula	66.99	63.93	71.07	7.14	−2.02	64.97	0.33	65.30	61.97	69.70	7.73	−1.69
Mozambique	Maputo Cidade	65.02	62.07	68.68	6.61	−1.96	63.06	0.32	63.38	60.17	67.36	7.19	−1.64
Mozambique	Maputo Provincia	62.72	59.85	65.86	6.01	−1.89	60.83	0.31	61.14	58.02	64.59	6.57	−1.58
Mozambique	Niassa	62.06	59.20	65.04	5.84	−1.87	60.19	0.31	60.50	57.39	63.78	6.39	−1.56
Mozambique	Sofala	61.52	58.66	64.36	5.70	−1.86	59.66	0.31	59.97	56.87	63.12	6.25	−1.55
Mozambique	Gaza	60.94	58.09	63.64	5.55	−1.83	59.11	0.30	59.41	56.31	62.41	6.10	−1.53
Mozambique	Manica	60.36	57.50	62.90	5.40	−1.82	58.54	0.30	58.84	55.74	61.69	5.95	−1.52
Mozambique	Cabo delgado	60.12	57.26	62.60	5.34	−1.81	58.31	0.30	58.61	55.51	61.40	5.89	−1.51
Mozambique	Tete	58.78	55.87	60.88	5.01	−1.77	57.01	0.29	57.30	54.16	59.71	5.55	−1.48
Mozambique	Zambezia	57.41	54.40	59.09	4.69	−1.73	55.68	0.28	55.96	52.74	57.95	5.21	−1.45
Uganda	Central 1 (Central South)	64.97	62.83	67.45	4.62	−0.30	64.67	0.97	65.64	63.44	68.19	4.75	0.67
Uganda	Kampala	64.23	62.11	66.54	4.43	−0.29	63.94	0.95	64.89	62.72	67.27	4.55	0.66
Uganda	Eastern (Bukedi, Bugishu, Teso)	64.19	62.07	66.48	4.41	−0.29	63.90	0.95	64.85	62.68	67.21	4.53	0.66
Uganda	Southwest (Ankole, Kigezi)	63.38	61.28	65.48	4.20	−0.28	63.10	0.93	64.03	61.88	66.20	4.32	0.65
Uganda	Central 2 (Central North)	62.86	60.77	64.83	4.06	−0.28	62.58	0.93	63.51	61.36	65.54	4.18	0.65
Uganda	North (Karamoja, Lango, Acholi)	62.77	60.67	64.71	4.04	−0.29	62.48	0.93	63.41	61.26	65.42	4.16	0.64
Uganda	Western (Bunyoro, Tooro)	61.52	59.42	63.14	3.72	−0.28	61.24	0.91	62.15	60.00	63.83	3.83	0.63
Uganda	East Central (Busoga)	61.50	59.41	63.12	3.71	−0.28	61.22	0.92	62.14	59.99	63.81	3.82	0.64
Uganda	West Nile	61.31	59.22	62.88	3.66	−0.28	61.03	0.91	61.94	59.79	63.57	3.78	0.63
Guinea-Bissau	Bafata	66.67	—	—	—	−1.35	65.32	0.23	65.55	63.01	68.87	5.86	−1.12
Guinea-Bissau	Cacheu	64.96	—	—	—	−1.31	63.65	0.22	63.87	61.46	66.84	5.38	−1.09
Guinea-Bissau	Oio	63.41	—	—	—	−1.28	62.13	0.22	62.35	60.04	64.98	4.94	−1.06
Guinea-Bissau	Tombali	62.24	—	—	—	−1.26	60.98	0.22	61.20	58.95	63.58	4.63	−1.04
Guinea-Bissau	Bolama	60.83	—	—	—	−1.23	59.60	0.21	59.81	57.62	61.86	4.24	−1.02
Guinea-Bissau	Bissau	60.79	—	—	—	−1.23	59.56	0.21	59.77	57.58	61.81	4.23	−1.02
Guinea-Bissau	Quinara	58.55	—	—	—	−1.18	57.37	0.20	57.57	55.43	59.07	3.64	−0.98
Guinea-Bissau	Biombo	56.44	—	—	—	−1.14	55.30	0.19	55.49	53.34	56.43	3.09	−0.95
Guinea-Bissau	Gabu	54.45	—	—	—	−1.10	53.35	0.19	53.54	51.29	53.88	2.59	−0.91
Comoros	Moheli	65.68	63.48	68.15	4.67	−0.63	65.05	0.29	65.34	63.03	67.96	4.93	−0.34
Comoros	Grande Comore (Ngazidja)	64.56	62.45	66.87	4.42	−0.17	64.39	0.51	64.90	62.63	67.45	4.82	0.34
Comoros	Anjouan (Ndzouani)	63.34	61.34	65.47	4.13	−1.05	62.29	0.05	62.34	60.29	64.52	4.23	−1.00
Burundi	South (Bururi, Makamba)	65.71	63.65	68.56	4.91	−0.72	64.99	0.33	65.32	63.37	68.05	4.68	−0.39
Burundi	East (Cankuzo, Rutana, Ruyigi )	64.16	62.13	66.62	4.49	−0.71	63.45	0.32	63.77	61.86	66.13	4.27	−0.39
Burundi	West (Bubanza, Buja Rural, Cibitoke, Mairie de Bujumbura)	63.70	61.68	66.05	4.37	−0.70	63.00	0.32	63.32	61.41	65.56	4.15	−0.38
Burundi	Middle (Gitega, Karuzi, Muramvya, Mwaro)	63.40	61.39	65.67	4.28	−0.70	62.70	0.32	63.02	61.12	65.18	4.06	−0.38
Burundi	North (Kayanza, Kirundo, Muyinga, Ngozi)	58.78	56.67	59.76	3.09	−0.64	58.14	0.29	58.43	56.43	59.32	2.89	−0.35
DR Congo	Nord-Kivu	65.54	63.40	68.74	5.34	−1.17	64.37	0.60	64.97	62.51	68.52	6.01	−0.57
DR Congo	Sud-Kivu	63.09	61.06	65.73	4.67	−1.14	61.95	0.58	62.53	60.21	65.52	5.31	−0.56
DR Congo	Orientale	62.92	60.90	65.52	4.62	−1.13	61.79	0.57	62.36	60.05	65.32	5.27	−0.56
DR Congo	Bandundu	62.50	60.50	65.01	4.51	−1.12	61.38	0.57	61.95	59.65	64.81	5.16	−0.55
DR Congo	Equateur	61.21	59.25	63.41	4.16	−1.10	60.11	0.56	60.67	58.42	63.22	4.80	−0.54
DR Congo	Bas-Congo	60.13	58.19	62.06	3.87	−1.08	59.05	0.55	59.60	57.38	61.87	4.49	−0.53
DR Congo	Kinshasa	59.79	57.85	61.63	3.78	−1.08	58.71	0.55	59.26	57.04	61.44	4.40	−0.53
DR Congo	Katanga	59.26	57.32	60.96	3.64	−1.07	58.19	0.54	58.73	56.52	60.77	4.25	−0.53
DR Congo	Maniema	58.95	57.01	60.57	3.56	−1.06	57.89	0.53	58.42	56.21	60.39	4.18	−0.53
DR Congo	Kasai Oriental	57.81	55.87	59.13	3.26	−1.04	56.77	0.53	57.30	55.08	58.95	3.87	−0.51
DR Congo	Kasai Occidental	53.64	51.47	53.71	2.24	−0.97	52.67	0.49	53.16	50.75	53.54	2.79	−0.48
South Africa	Limpopo	69.12	65.50	72.52	7.02	−4.01	65.11	−0.90	64.21	61.08	67.35	6.27	−4.91
South Africa	Western Cape	67.48	64.03	70.63	6.60	−3.91	63.57	−0.87	62.70	59.71	65.59	5.88	−4.78
South Africa	KwaZulu Natal	67.33	63.89	70.45	6.56	−3.90	63.43	−0.88	62.55	59.58	65.43	5.85	−4.78
South Africa	Gauteng	67.03	63.61	70.10	6.49	−3.88	63.15	−0.88	62.27	59.32	65.11	5.79	−4.76
South Africa	Northern Cape	66.11	62.78	69.04	6.26	−3.83	62.28	−0.86	61.42	58.55	64.12	5.57	−4.69
South Africa	Free State	64.04	60.87	66.61	5.74	−3.71	60.33	−0.83	59.50	56.76	61.86	5.10	−4.54
South Africa	Eastern Cape	64.00	60.83	66.56	5.73	−3.70	60.30	−0.84	59.46	56.73	61.82	5.09	−4.54
South Africa	North West	63.89	60.72	66.43	5.71	−3.70	60.19	−0.83	59.36	56.63	61.69	5.06	−4.53
South Africa	Mpumalanga	62.95	59.84	65.31	5.47	−3.65	59.30	−0.82	58.48	55.80	60.66	4.86	−4.47
Cote d'Ivoire	Comoe	63.86	62.55	66.14	3.59	−0.34	63.52	0.35	63.87	62.47	66.34	3.87	0.01
Cote d'Ivoire	Yamoussoukro	63.22	62.15	65.33	3.18	−1.76	61.46	0.33	61.79	60.50	63.82	3.32	−1.43
Cote d'Ivoire	Lagunes	61.79	60.59	63.63	3.04	−0.55	61.24	0.33	61.57	60.28	63.55	3.27	−0.22
Cote d'Ivoire	Zanzan	61.29	59.88	62.86	2.98	−0.26	61.03	0.33	61.36	60.08	63.29	3.21	0.07
Cote d'Ivoire	Abidjan	61.99	60.86	63.94	3.08	−1.00	60.99	0.33	61.32	60.04	63.25	3.21	−0.67
Cote d'Ivoire	Goh-Djiboua	60.74	59.58	62.35	2.77	−0.68	60.06	0.32	60.38	59.13	62.10	2.97	−0.36
Cote d'Ivoire	Bas Sassandra	60.42	59.29	61.98	2.69	−0.82	59.60	0.32	59.92	58.67	61.52	2.85	−0.50
Cote d'Ivoire	Vallee du Bandama	60.20	59.03	61.67	2.64	−0.64	59.56	0.32	59.88	58.64	61.48	2.84	−0.32
Cote d'Ivoire	Lacs	58.85	57.74	60.04	2.30	−1.02	57.83	0.31	58.14	56.91	59.32	2.41	−0.71
Cote d'Ivoire	Sassandra-Marahoue	58.47	57.36	59.57	2.21	−1.03	57.44	0.31	57.75	56.52	58.83	2.31	−0.72
Cote d'Ivoire	Savanes	58.00	56.87	58.97	2.10	−1.05	56.95	0.31	57.26	56.02	58.21	2.19	−0.74
Cote d'Ivoire	Montagnes	56.04	54.75	56.41	1.66	−0.76	55.28	0.30	55.58	54.30	56.08	1.78	−0.46
Cote d'Ivoire	Woroba	54.01	52.36	53.62	1.26	−0.75	53.26	0.29	53.55	52.13	53.45	1.32	−0.46
Cote d'Ivoire	Denguele	52.28	50.60	51.45	0.85	−0.99	51.29	0.28	51.57	49.90	50.80	0.90	−0.71
Equatorial Guinea	Litoral	64.29	—	—	—	−1.09	63.20	0.62	63.82	63.01	67.35	4.34	−0.47
Equatorial Guinea	Centro Sur	62.32	—	—	—	−1.07	61.25	0.61	61.86	60.39	64.34	3.95	−0.46
Equatorial Guinea	Annobon, Bioko	61.58	—	—	—	−1.05	60.53	0.59	61.12	59.33	63.15	3.82	−0.46
Equatorial Guinea	Kie Ntem	61.06	—	—	—	−1.04	60.02	0.59	60.61	58.55	62.29	3.74	−0.45
Equatorial Guinea	Wele Nzas	58.79	—	—	—	−1.01	57.78	0.57	58.35	54.09	57.76	3.67	−0.44
Gambia	Basse	64.03	62.59	65.52	2.93	−1.27	62.76	0.84	63.60	62.14	65.18	3.04	−0.43
Gambia	Brikama	64.17	62.73	65.69	2.96	−1.57	62.60	0.83	63.43	61.99	64.98	2.99	−0.74
Gambia	Kanifing	64.96	63.49	66.64	3.15	−2.57	62.39	0.83	63.22	61.78	64.72	2.94	−1.74
Gambia	Banjul	64.39	62.95	65.96	3.01	−2.23	62.16	0.82	62.98	61.56	64.44	2.88	−1.41
Gambia	Kerewan	64.12	62.68	65.63	2.95	−2.25	61.87	0.82	62.69	61.28	64.09	2.81	−1.43
Gambia	Janjanbureh	62.33	60.93	63.44	2.51	−1.09	61.24	0.81	62.05	60.65	63.31	2.66	−0.28
Gambia	Kuntaur	60.57	59.19	61.28	2.09	−0.90	59.67	0.80	60.47	59.09	61.36	2.27	−0.10
Gambia	Mansakonko	61.65	60.27	62.61	2.34	−1.99	59.66	0.79	60.45	59.08	61.34	2.26	−1.20
South Sudan	Unity	63.94	62.54	67.38	4.84	−1.07	62.87	0.68	63.55	62.05	67.09	5.04	−0.39
South Sudan	Jonglei	62.20	60.85	65.23	4.38	−1.04	61.16	0.66	61.82	60.37	64.96	4.59	−0.38
South Sudan	Lakes	59.68	58.35	62.09	3.74	−1.00	58.68	0.63	59.31	57.89	61.83	3.94	−0.37
South Sudan	Upper Nile	57.75	56.39	59.66	3.27	−0.96	56.79	0.61	57.40	55.94	59.40	3.46	−0.35
South Sudan	Western Bahr El Ghazal	55.46	53.99	56.71	2.72	−0.93	54.53	0.59	55.12	53.56	56.47	2.91	−0.34
South Sudan	Western Equatoria	54.44	52.89	55.37	2.48	−0.91	53.53	0.57	54.10	52.47	55.13	2.66	−0.34
South Sudan	Warrap	53.89	52.28	54.64	2.36	−0.90	52.99	0.57	53.56	51.87	54.41	2.54	−0.33
South Sudan	Central Equatoria	53.48	51.84	54.10	2.26	−0.89	52.59	0.56	53.15	51.42	53.87	2.45	−0.33
South Sudan	Eastern Equatoria	52.98	51.27	53.43	2.16	−0.89	52.09	0.57	52.66	50.86	53.20	2.34	−0.32
South Sudan	Northern Bahr El Ghazal	50.53	48.38	50.04	1.66	−0.85	49.68	0.54	50.22	48.00	49.83	1.83	−0.31
Kenya	Eastern	64.50	62.10	67.08	4.98	−1.62	62.88	0.62	63.50	60.88	66.36	5.48	−1.00
Kenya	North Eastern	64.05	61.70	66.57	4.87	−1.81	62.24	0.51	62.75	60.21	65.50	5.29	−1.30
Kenya	Rift Valley	63.88	61.54	66.36	4.82	−1.83	62.05	0.49	62.54	60.02	65.26	5.24	−1.34
Kenya	Coast	63.14	60.86	65.51	4.65	−1.37	61.77	0.70	62.47	59.95	65.17	5.22	−0.67
Kenya	Nairobi	62.09	59.88	64.27	4.39	−0.98	61.11	0.89	62.00	59.53	64.62	5.09	−0.09
Kenya	Central	63.60	61.29	66.04	4.75	−2.08	61.52	0.36	61.88	59.42	64.48	5.06	−1.72
Kenya	Western	61.84	59.66	63.99	4.33	−1.48	60.36	0.61	60.97	58.59	63.42	4.83	−0.87
Kenya	Nyanza	60.49	58.38	62.39	4.01	−1.04	59.45	0.82	60.27	57.95	62.60	4.65	−0.22
Liberia	Bong	63.05	61.86	64.75	2.89	0.04	63.09	0.37	63.46	62.18	65.37	3.19	0.41
Liberia	Nimba	63.59	62.42	65.44	3.02	−0.74	62.85	0.37	63.22	61.94	65.07	3.13	−0.37
Liberia	Bomi	62.27	61.04	63.74	2.70	0.28	62.55	0.37	62.92	61.64	64.69	3.05	0.65
Liberia	Lofa	62.13	60.94	63.60	2.66	−0.46	61.67	0.36	62.03	60.75	63.57	2.82	−0.10
Liberia	Rivercess	62.03	60.84	63.47	2.63	−0.43	61.60	0.35	61.95	60.67	63.48	2.81	−0.08
Liberia	River Gee	61.17	59.92	62.35	2.43	0.20	61.37	0.36	61.73	60.44	63.19	2.75	0.56
Liberia	Montserrado	61.49	60.29	62.79	2.50	−0.33	61.16	0.36	61.52	60.23	62.93	2.70	0.03
Liberia	Grand Gedeh	60.91	59.69	62.05	2.36	−0.24	60.67	0.35	61.02	59.71	62.29	2.58	0.11
Liberia	Maryland	60.42	59.18	61.42	2.24	−0.17	60.25	0.35	60.60	59.28	61.75	2.47	0.18
Liberia	Grand Kru	59.55	58.24	60.28	2.04	0.04	59.59	0.35	59.94	58.59	60.90	2.31	0.39
Liberia	Margibi	59.97	58.71	60.84	2.13	−0.72	59.25	0.34	59.59	58.23	60.46	2.23	−0.38
Liberia	Gbarpolu	58.83	57.49	59.36	1.87	−0.48	58.35	0.34	58.69	57.27	59.28	2.01	−0.14
Liberia	Grand Bassa	58.38	57.01	58.77	1.76	−0.55	57.83	0.34	58.17	56.70	58.59	1.89	−0.21
Liberia	Sinoe	56.85	55.30	56.73	1.43	−0.95	55.90	0.32	56.22	54.54	56.00	1.46	−0.63
Liberia	Grand Cape Mount	55.62	53.89	55.05	1.16	−0.66	54.96	0.32	55.28	53.44	54.69	1.25	−0.34
Zimbabwe	Matabeleland South	65.42	62.48	68.52	6.04	−2.17	63.25	0.14	63.39	60.12	66.84	6.72	−2.03
Zimbabwe	Bulawayo	64.78	61.89	67.78	5.89	−2.15	62.63	0.14	62.77	59.55	66.11	6.56	−2.01
Zimbabwe	Masvingo	64.42	61.56	67.35	5.79	−2.14	62.28	0.14	62.42	59.23	65.69	6.46	−2.00
Zimbabwe	Matabeleland North	63.82	61.01	66.65	5.64	−2.12	61.70	0.14	61.84	58.70	65.01	6.31	−1.98
Zimbabwe	Harare	62.33	59.62	64.90	5.28	−2.07	60.26	0.14	60.40	57.37	63.30	5.93	−1.93
Zimbabwe	Mashonaland East	61.97	59.29	64.47	5.18	−2.06	59.91	0.14	60.05	57.05	62.88	5.83	−1.92
Zimbabwe	Manicaland	60.62	58.01	62.86	4.85	−2.02	58.60	0.14	58.74	55.81	61.31	5.50	−1.88
Zimbabwe	Midlands	60.56	57.95	62.79	4.84	−2.02	58.54	0.14	58.68	55.76	61.24	5.48	−1.88
Zimbabwe	Mashonaland Central	58.96	56.42	60.87	4.45	−1.96	57.00	0.13	57.13	54.29	59.37	5.08	−1.83
Zimbabwe	Mashonaland West	57.95	55.44	59.65	4.21	−1.92	56.03	0.13	56.16	53.34	58.18	4.84	−1.79
Togo	Plateaux	62.40	61.85	63.27	1.42	0.74	63.14	−0.04	63.10	62.46	64.08	1.62	0.70
Togo	Lome	61.63	61.08	62.33	1.25	0.73	62.36	−0.03	62.33	61.69	63.13	1.44	0.70
Togo	Centrale	60.99	60.44	61.56	1.12	0.72	61.71	−0.03	61.68	61.04	62.34	1.30	0.69
Togo	Savanes	60.46	59.91	60.91	1.00	0.72	61.18	−0.03	61.15	60.50	61.69	1.19	0.69
Togo	Maritime	59.93	59.36	60.24	0.88	0.70	60.63	−0.03	60.60	59.94	61.01	1.07	0.67
Togo	Kara	58.27	57.64	58.18	0.54	0.68	58.95	−0.03	58.92	58.21	58.92	0.71	0.65
Namibia	Hardap	66.60	62.62	70.79	8.17	−4.02	62.58	−1.28	61.30	57.53	65.55	8.02	−5.30
Namibia	Khomas	66.00	62.08	70.08	8.00	−3.99	62.01	−1.26	60.75	57.03	64.90	7.87	−5.25
Namibia	ǁKaras	65.58	61.71	69.59	7.88	−3.96	61.62	−1.26	60.36	56.69	64.44	7.75	−5.22
Namibia	Kunene	65.42	61.56	69.41	7.85	−3.95	61.47	−1.25	60.22	56.56	64.27	7.71	−5.20
Namibia	Omusati	65.39	61.54	69.37	7.83	−3.95	61.44	−1.25	60.19	56.53	64.24	7.71	−5.20
Namibia	Omaheke	65.18	61.34	69.12	7.78	−3.94	61.24	−1.25	59.99	56.35	64.00	7.65	−5.19
Namibia	Oshana	65.15	61.32	69.09	7.77	−3.93	61.22	−1.25	59.97	56.33	63.98	7.65	−5.18
Namibia	Otjozondjupa	64.38	60.62	68.18	7.56	−3.89	60.49	−1.23	59.26	55.69	63.13	7.44	−5.12
Namibia	Erongo	64.04	60.31	67.78	7.47	−3.87	60.17	−1.22	58.95	55.40	62.76	7.36	−5.09
Namibia	Oshikoto	61.66	58.12	64.95	6.83	−3.72	57.94	−1.18	56.76	53.39	60.15	6.76	−4.90
Namibia	Zambezi	60.89	57.40	64.03	6.63	−3.67	57.22	−1.17	56.05	52.73	59.29	6.56	−4.84
Namibia	Ohangwena	59.92	56.48	62.86	6.38	−3.62	56.30	−1.15	55.15	51.89	58.20	6.31	−4.77
Namibia	Kavango East, Kavango West	57.45	54.11	59.85	5.74	−3.47	53.98	−1.10	52.88	49.71	55.42	5.71	−4.57
Benin	Borgou (inc. Alibori)	61.24	59.85	62.85	3.00	−1.42	59.82	0.13	59.95	58.27	61.68	3.41	−1.29
Benin	Ouémé (inc. Plateau)	61.20	59.81	62.80	2.99	−1.38	59.82	0.13	59.95	58.27	61.68	3.41	−1.25
Benin	Atlantique (inc. Littoral (Cotonou))	60.88	59.48	62.40	2.92	−1.06	59.82	0.13	59.95	58.27	61.68	3.41	−0.93
Benin	Zou (inc. Collines)	60.16	58.74	61.48	2.74	−0.34	59.82	0.13	59.95	58.27	61.68	3.41	−0.21
Benin	Mono (inc. Kouffo)	59.92	58.50	61.18	2.68	−0.10	59.82	0.13	59.95	58.27	61.68	3.41	0.03
Benin	Atakora (inc. Donga)	58.78	57.28	59.68	2.40	1.04	59.82	0.13	59.95	58.27	61.68	3.41	1.17
Burkina Faso	Centre-Est	61.30	59.49	63.45	3.96	−2.03	59.27	0.50	59.77	57.95	61.51	3.56	−1.53
Burkina Faso	Centre (inc. Ouagadougou)	61.03	59.23	63.11	3.88	−1.76	59.27	0.50	59.77	57.95	61.51	3.56	−1.26
Burkina Faso	Centre-Nord	60.56	58.75	62.52	3.77	−1.29	59.27	0.50	59.77	57.95	61.51	3.56	−0.79
Burkina Faso	Centre-Sud	60.37	58.54	62.27	3.73	−1.10	59.27	0.50	59.77	57.95	61.51	3.56	−0.60
Burkina Faso	Boucle du Mouhoun	60.23	58.39	62.08	3.69	−0.96	59.27	0.50	59.77	57.95	61.51	3.56	−0.46
Burkina Faso	Plateau-Central	60.20	58.36	62.04	3.68	−0.93	59.27	0.50	59.77	57.95	61.51	3.56	−0.43
Burkina Faso	Hauts-Bassins	60.14	58.28	61.95	3.67	−0.87	59.27	0.50	59.77	57.95	61.51	3.56	−0.37
Burkina Faso	Centre-Ouest	60.12	58.26	61.93	3.67	−0.85	59.27	0.50	59.77	57.95	61.51	3.56	−0.35
Burkina Faso	Nord	59.96	58.08	61.71	3.63	−0.69	59.27	0.50	59.77	57.95	61.51	3.56	−0.19
Burkina Faso	Cascades	59.74	57.82	61.40	3.58	−0.47	59.27	0.50	59.77	57.95	61.51	3.56	0.03
Burkina Faso	Est	59.55	57.58	61.13	3.55	−0.28	59.27	0.50	59.77	57.95	61.51	3.56	0.22
Burkina Faso	Sud-Ouest	59.47	57.46	61.00	3.54	−0.20	59.27	0.50	59.77	57.95	61.51	3.56	0.30
Burkina Faso	Sahel	59.18	56.98	60.50	3.52	0.09	59.27	0.50	59.77	57.95	61.51	3.56	0.59
CAR	Bangui	59.67	57.69	63.09	5.40	−1.22	58.45	0.63	59.08	56.83	62.78	5.95	−0.59
CAR	RS IV (Haute-Kotto, Bamingui-Bangoran, Vakaga)	59.00	57.03	62.23	5.20	−1.21	57.79	0.62	58.41	56.18	61.93	5.75	−0.59
CAR	RS II (Mambéré-Kadéï, Nana-Mambéré, Sangha-Mbaéré)	56.89	54.95	59.53	4.58	−1.17	55.72	0.61	56.33	54.13	59.25	5.12	−0.56
CAR	RS III (Ouham-Pendé, Ouham)	54.58	52.59	56.52	3.93	−1.12	53.46	0.58	54.04	51.81	56.25	4.44	−0.54
CAR	RS I (Ombella-M'Poko, Lobaye, Kémo, Nana-Mambéré, Ouaka)	53.68	51.64	55.33	3.69	−1.11	52.57	0.57	53.14	50.87	55.06	4.19	−0.54
CAR	RS V (Basse Kotto, Mbomou, Haut-Mbomou)	52.46	50.34	53.70	3.36	−1.07	51.39	0.55	51.94	49.59	53.44	3.85	−0.52
Chad	Zone 4 (Ouaddaï, Assongha, Sila, Biltine - Wadi Fira)	59.22	57.73	62.63	4.90	−0.82	58.40	0.53	58.93	57.33	62.48	5.15	−0.29
Chad	Zone 2 (Borkou, Ennedi Est, Ennedi Ouest, Tibesti, Kanem, Bahr el-Gazel, Lac)	57.67	56.20	60.66	4.46	−0.80	56.87	0.52	57.39	55.80	60.50	4.70	−0.28
Chad	Zone 1 (N'Djamena )	56.69	55.22	59.40	4.18	−0.78	55.91	0.50	56.41	54.83	59.25	4.42	−0.28
Chad	Zone 3 (Guéra, Batha, Salamat)	56.56	55.08	59.23	4.15	−0.78	55.78	0.50	56.28	54.70	59.08	4.38	−0.28
Chad	Zone 6 (Mayo-Kebbi Est, Mayo-Kebbi Ouest)	53.01	51.40	54.58	3.18	−0.73	52.28	0.47	52.75	51.04	54.44	3.40	−0.26
Chad	Zone 8 (Mandoul, Moyen-Chari, Bahr Koh, Lac)	52.29	50.62	53.61	2.99	−0.72	51.57	0.47	52.04	50.27	53.48	3.21	−0.25
Chad	Zone 5 (Chari-Baguimi, Dababa, Baguirmi, Hadjer-Lamis)	51.00	49.19	51.85	2.66	−0.70	50.30	0.45	50.75	48.84	51.72	2.88	−0.25
Chad	Zone 7 (Logone Occidental, Logone Oriental, Monts de Lam, Tandjile Est & Ouest)	48.48	46.18	48.26	2.08	−0.67	47.81	0.43	48.24	45.86	48.13	2.27	−0.24
Eswatini	Hhohho	64.00	60.12	68.49	8.37	−4.17	59.83	−0.97	58.86	54.86	63.59	8.73	−5.14
Eswatini	Lubombo	62.19	58.46	66.32	7.86	−3.38	58.81	−0.63	58.18	54.26	62.77	8.51	−4.01
Eswatini	Shiselweni	58.83	55.33	62.23	6.90	−2.80	56.03	−0.41	55.62	51.98	59.71	7.73	−3.21
Eswatini	Manzini	58.04	54.66	61.33	6.67	−3.71	54.33	−0.85	53.48	50.05	57.12	7.07	−4.56
Lesotho	Butha-Buthe	59.52	56.34	63.46	7.12	−1.23	58.29	−0.02	58.27	55.15	62.20	7.05	−1.25
Lesotho	Mohale s Hoek	57.34	54.36	60.87	6.51	−1.18	56.16	−0.03	56.13	53.21	59.67	6.46	−1.21
Lesotho	Berea	57.10	54.14	60.59	6.45	−1.17	55.93	−0.03	55.90	53.00	59.39	6.39	−1.20
Lesotho	Maseru	54.43	51.65	57.36	5.71	−1.12	53.31	−0.02	53.29	50.56	56.23	5.67	−1.14
Lesotho	Thaba-Tseka	52.79	50.08	55.36	5.28	−1.08	51.71	−0.03	51.68	49.02	54.26	5.24	−1.11
Lesotho	Leribe	52.63	49.92	55.16	5.24	−1.08	51.55	−0.03	51.52	48.87	54.07	5.20	−1.11
Lesotho	Mafeteng	52.58	49.88	55.10	5.22	−1.08	51.50	−0.03	51.47	48.82	54.01	5.19	−1.11
Lesotho	Mokhotlong	52.41	49.71	54.89	5.18	−1.08	51.33	−0.02	51.31	48.66	53.80	5.14	−1.10
Lesotho	Qasha s Nek	52.08	49.39	54.48	5.09	−1.07	51.01	−0.03	50.98	48.34	53.40	5.06	−1.10
Lesotho	Quthing	50.22	47.55	52.16	4.61	−1.03	49.19	−0.02	49.17	46.55	51.13	4.58	−1.05

== See also ==
- List of African countries by life expectancy
- List of South African provinces by life expectancy
- List of oldest people
- Longevity
- Life extension
