= Nianimaru Forest Park =

- IUCN category IV (habitat/species management area)
- Interactive map of Nianimaru Forest Park
- Location: Central River Division Gambia
- Nearest city: Kuntaur
- Coordinates: 13°43′16″N 14°57′29″W
- Area: 607 ha (1,500 acres)
- Established: January 1, 1954

Nianimaru Forest Park is a forest park in the Gambia. Established on January 1, 1954, it covers 607 hectares.

It is located in Central River, Gambia. The estimated terrain elevation above sea level is four metres.

The Nianimaru Forest Park is located in a region where numerous Senegambian stone circles can be found, including the stone circles of Niani Maru.
