= Jarra =

Jarra may refer to

- Jarra Central, one of the six districts of the Lower River Division of the Gambia
- Jarra East, one of the six districts of the Lower River Division of the Gambia
- Jarra West, one of the six districts of the Lower River Division of the Gambia
- Jarra (wasp), a genus in subfamily Doryctinae

== See also ==
- Jarrah (disambiguation)
- Jarrow, a community in England
