= Kahi Badi Forest Park =

- IUCN category IV (habitat/species management area)
- Interactive map of Kahi Badi Forest Park
- Location: Central River Division Gambia
- Nearest city: Kuntaur
- Coordinates: 13°44′37″N 15°2′46″W
- Area: 1,485 ha (3,670 acres)
- Established: January 1, 1954

Kahi Badi Forest Park is a forest park in the Gambia. Established on January 1, 1954, it covers 1485 hectares.

The estimate terrain elevation above sea level is 45 metres.
