= Niani =

Niani may refer to:

- Niani District, a district of the Central River Division of the Gambia
- The Kingdom of Niani, a pre-colonial kingdom which gave its name to the District
- Niani, Guinea, a village in Guinea
- Niani, an alternative name of the Mali Empire
