= Niamina East =

Coordinates: 13°38′N 15°05′W

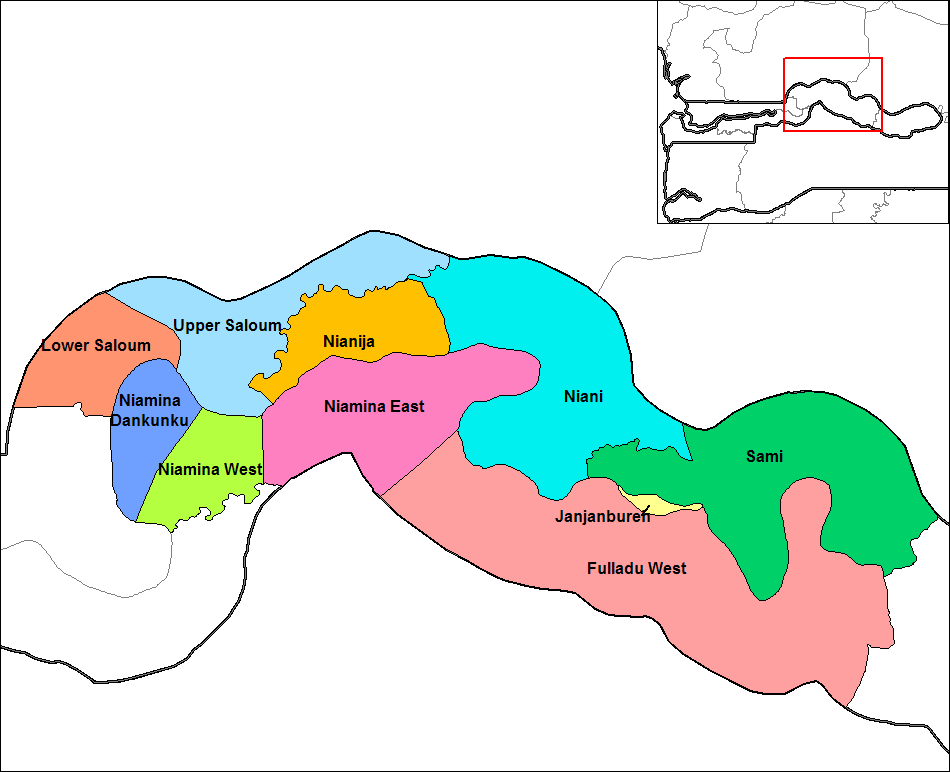
Districts of Central River Division

Niamina East is one of the ten districts of the Central River Division of the Gambia. Its population in the 2013 census was 24,571.
