= Subdivisions of the Gambia =

Overview of Gambian administrative divisions

Regions of The Gambia

The Gambia is divided into five administrative regions (Note: Until 2007, these areas were known as "divisions") and one City. The divisions of The Gambia are created by the Independent Electoral Commission in accordance to Article 192 of the National Constitution.

During the 2013 census, the Western region was the most populated with a population of 699,704, while the Lower River region was the least populated with 82,361. The maximum density of population was seen in Western with 396.59 persons per km^{2}, while it was lowest in Lower River with 50.90 persons per km^{2}. The maximum number of households was in Western region with 45,396 households as of 2003. Lower River had the highest infant mortality rate of 96 for every thousand births and under-five mortality of 137 per every thousand births. In 2003, the poverty gap ratio was greatest in Central River with 36.45% and lowest in Lower River with 19.80%.

The Local Government Act passed in 2002 superseded the previous local government acts like Local Government Act (Amended 1984), Local Government (City of Banjul) Act (Amended 1988), The Kanifing Municipal Council Act 1991 and the Provinces Act. There were six Local Government Areas, each subdivided into districts and wards. Residents elect a mayor and councilmen, with the mayor serving as chairman of the council.

== Regions ==
Name	Capital	Status	Area (km^{2})	Population (2013)	Population (2024)	Density per km^{2}	Image
Central River	Janjanbureh	Region	2,894.25	221,907	265,516	92	
Greater Banjul (including the municipality of Kanifing)		City plus Municipality	87.78	408,188	405,809	4,623	
Lower River	Mansa Konko	Region	1,618.00	81,042	90,624	56	
North Bank	Kerewan	Region	2,255.50	220,080	248,475	110	
Upper River	Basse Santa Su	Region	2,069.50	237,220	261,160	126	
West Coast	Brikama	Region	1,764.25	688,744	1,151,128	652	

The Gambia is also additionally divided into eight Local Government Areas, of which two are the City of Banjul and the Municipality of Kanifing; these two collectively form Greater Banjul, although the latter now extends to parts of Brikama LGA, the former Western Division. The other six LGAs comprise the former five Divisions, although the Central River Division was divided into two LGAs, Janjanbureh LGA in the east and Kuntaur LGA in the west. The Local Government Areas are further subdivided into 43 districts. Of these, Kombo Saint Mary (which shares Brikama as a capital with the Brikama LGA) may have been administratively merged with the Greater Banjul area.

== Local Government Areas ==
=== History ===
The Gambia, along with modern-day Senegal, were colonies of France and Britain until 1894 when it became a British colony. Both the countries gained independence in 1965 and operated in a federation called Senegambia from 1982. During 1989, the confederation collapsed. In a bloodless coup, Lieutenant Yahya Jammeh in 1994 and went on to win multi party elections in three subsequent elections. He has also defeated coups successfully and unlike the West African countries, The Gambia has a relative stable governance.

The Local Government Act passed in 2002 superseded the previous local government acts like Local Government Act (Amended 1984), Local Government (City of Banjul) Act (Amended 1988), The Kanifing Municipal Council Act 1991 and the Provinces Act. There were six local governments defined, each subdivided into districts and wards. The Mayor who is the chairperson of the council and the council members of each council are elected by people of the area. The legislation indicating the roles was not clearly defined, but the council is responsible for finance, services and planning for each sector under it. Around 25 per cent of the budget is provisioned by the central government. The council also has a Alkalo or Seyfo representative, a Chief representative, a youth nominee, a woman nominee and other nominated members of local interest groups. The city and area council elections were last held during April 2002.

=== List of Local Government Areas ===
The country of The Gambia is divided into eight Local Government Areas (LGAs). They are:

1. Banjul
2. Basse Santa Su
3. Brikama
4. Janjanbureh
5. Kanifing
6. Kerewan
7. Kuntaur
8. Mansa Konko

Brikama is the fastest growing LGA in The Gambia as of 2024. Sexual and reproductive health education is supposed to be handled by LGAs, but is poorly managed in practice.

== Districts ==
Additionally, the LGAs of The Gambia are divided into districts, each with its population at the 15 April 2013 census (provisional returns).

The former Banjul Region is now divided into two Local Government Areas - Banjul City (which is now subdivided into three districts) and Kanifing (consisting of a single district).

The former Central River Division is now divided into two LGAs - Janjanbureh LGA in the east and Kuntaur LGA in the west.

Each of the other former Divisions has now become an LGA with no change in extent (although each was renamed after its administrative centre).

=== List of districts ===
==== Banjul LGA ====
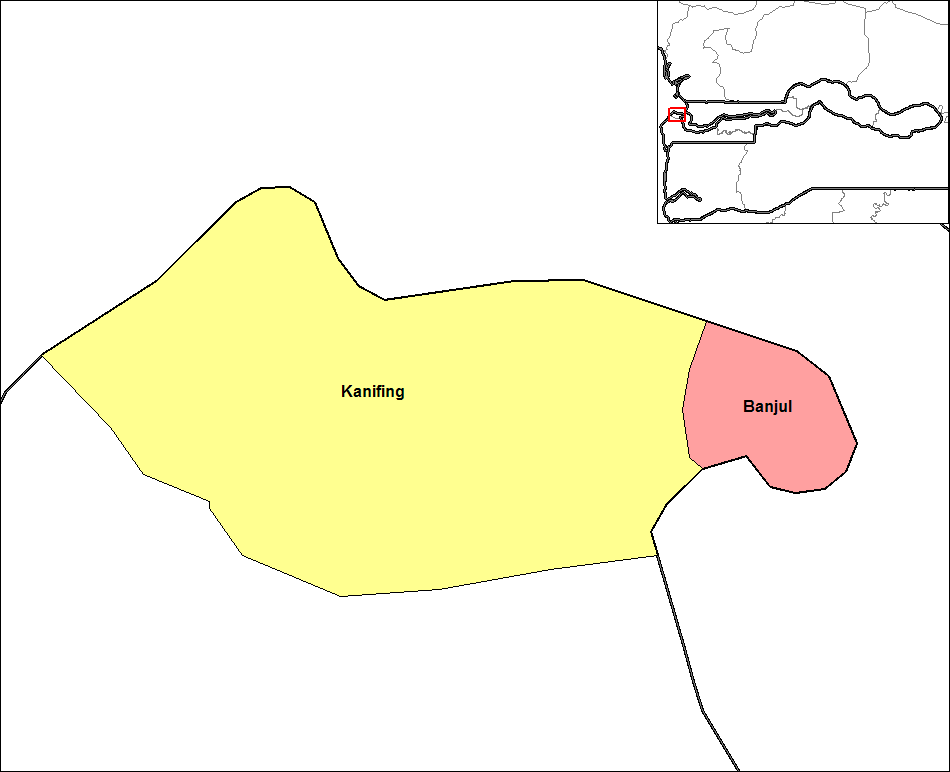
Districts of Banjul Division

This Local Government Area encompasses the City of Banjul, consisting of the island of that name (previously called St Mary's Island).

- Banjul Central (11,697)
- Banjul North (11,334)
- Banjul South (8,270)

==== Kanifing LGA ====
This district is the mainland extension of Banjul City, comprising the majority of Greater Banjul. It's coloured yellow on the map above.

- Kanifing (382,096)

==== Basse Santa Su LGA ====
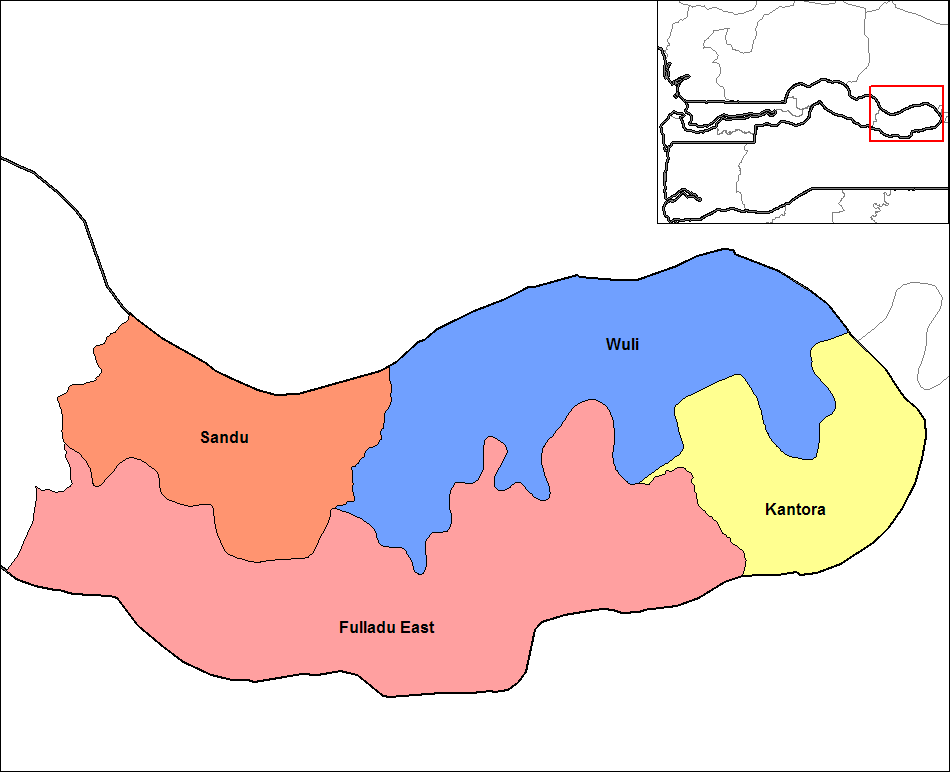
Districts of Upper River Division

(previously the Upper River Division)

- Basse Fulladu East (49,990)
- Jimara (43,460)
- Kantora (38,784)
- Sandu (23,884)
- Tumana (37,561)
- Wuli East (23,691)
- Wuli West (22,546)

==== Brikama LGA ====
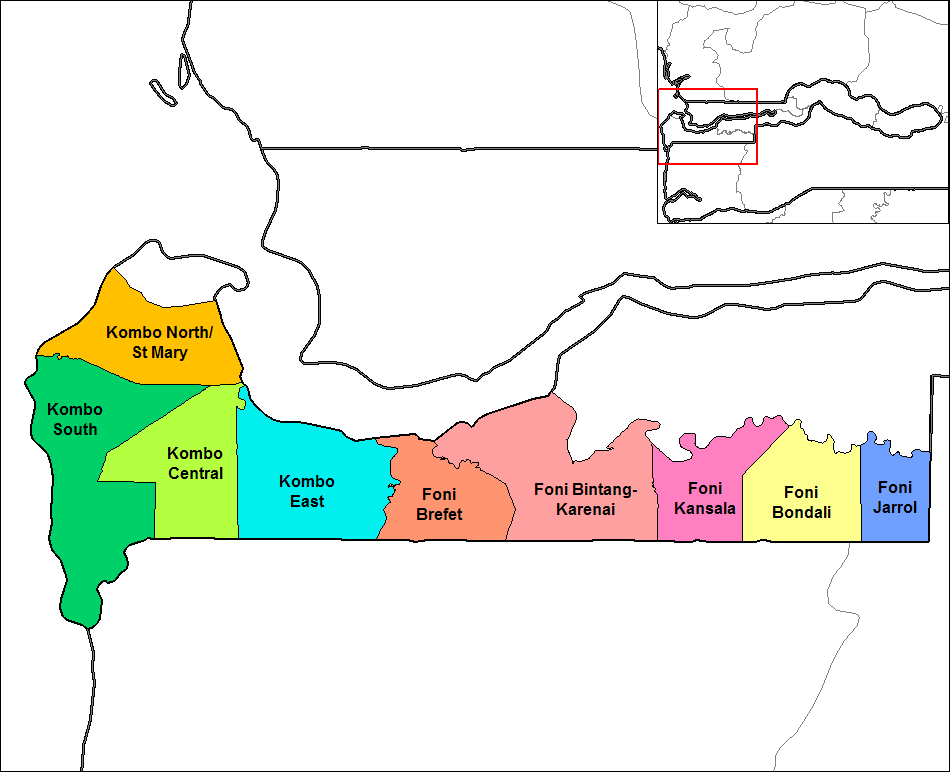
Districts of Western Division

(previously the Western Division)

- Foni Bintang-Karenai (16,986)
- Foni Bondali (7,741)
- Foni Brefet (14,414)
- Foni Jarrol (7,010)
- Foni Kansala (14,238)
- Kombo Central (142,831)
- Kombo East (42,955)
- Kombo North (344,756)
- Kombo South (108,773)

==== Janjanbureh LGA ====
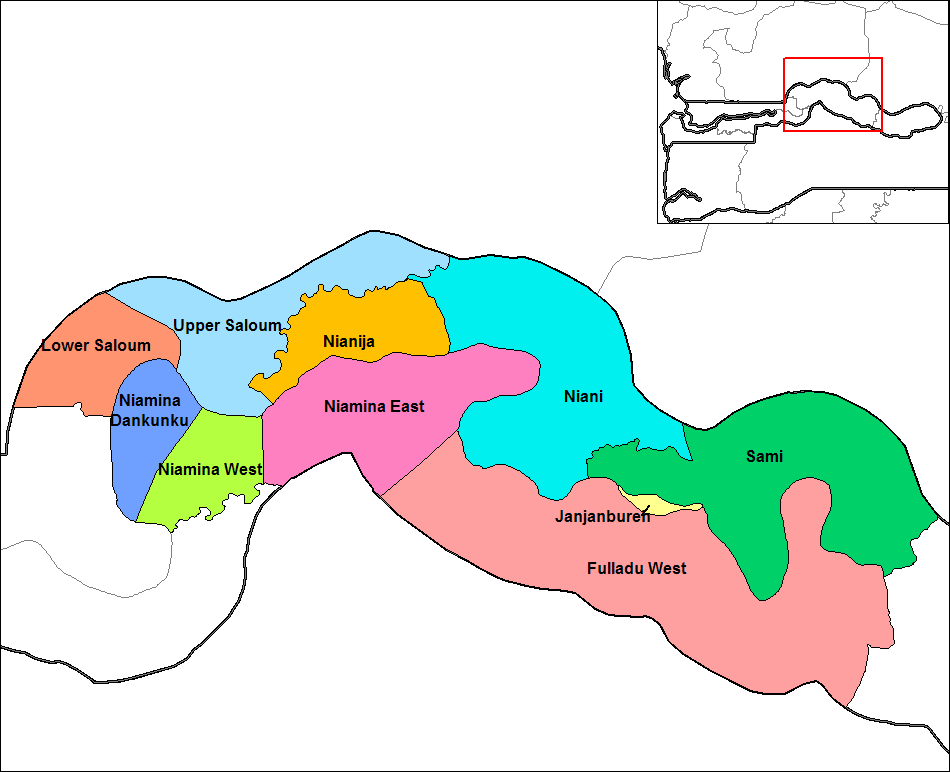
Districts of Central River Division

(the southern half of the former Central River Division)

- Fulladu West (84,961)
- Janjanbureh (3,988)
- Niamina Dankunku (6,097)
- Niamina East (24,571)
- Niamina West (7,293)

==== Kuntaur LGA ====
(the northern half of the former Central River Division)

- Lower Saloum (15,881)
- Niani (29,478)
- Nianija (10,175)
- Sami (24,429)
- Upper Saloum (19,145)

==== Kerewan LGA ====
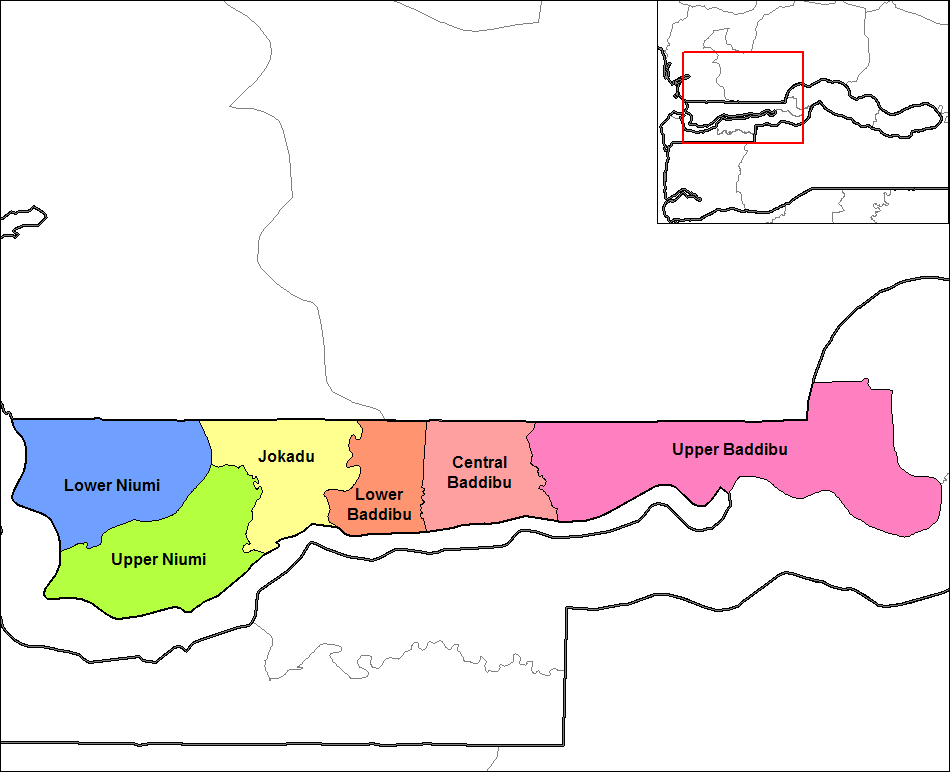
Districts of North Bank Division

(previously the North Bank Division)

- Central Baddibu (20,104)
- Illiasa (41,603)
- Jokadu (22,132)
- Lower Baddibu (18,030)
- Lower Niumi (57,358)
- Sabach Sanjal (30,347)
- Upper Niumi (31,480)

==== Mansa Konko LGA ====
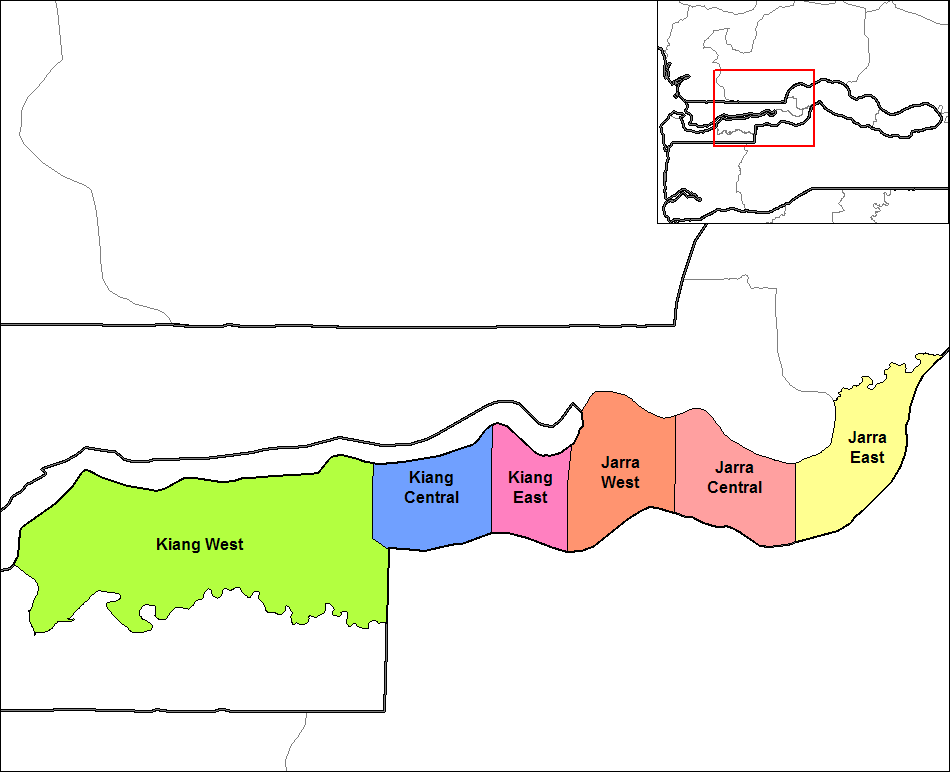
Districts of Lower River Division

(previously the Lower River Division)

- Jarra Central (8,437)
- Jarra East (16,551)
- Jarra West (27,205)
- Kiang Central (8,366)
- Kiang East (6,849)
- Kiang West (14,953)

== Demographics ==
Per 2013 census, Western region was the most populated with a population of 699,704, while Lower River was the least populated with 82,361. The maximum density of population was seen in Western with 396.59 persons per km^{2}, while it was lowest in Lower River with 50.90 persons per km^{2}. The maximum number of households was in Western region with 45,396 households as of 2003. Lower River had the highest infant mortality rate of 96 for every thousand births and under-five mortality of 137 per every thousand births. The poverty gap ratio was maximum in Central River with 36.45 per cent as of 2003 and lowest in Lower River with 19.80 per cent. The literacy rate was maximum in Western with 69.7 per cent compared to a national average of 62.9 per cent, while the lowest was in Upper River with 39 per cent as of 2007. The net enrollment ratio in primary education was maximum in Western (70 %), children entering first grade of primary school reaching last grade of primary education was 100 per cent in Northern Bank and the ratios of boys against girls in primary, secondary and tertiary education was maximum (1.13) in Lower River as of 2007.

== See also ==
- ISO 3166-2:GM
- List of local government areas of The Gambia by Human Development Index
