= Sami District =

District of the Gambia

Coordinates: 13°35′N 14°35′W

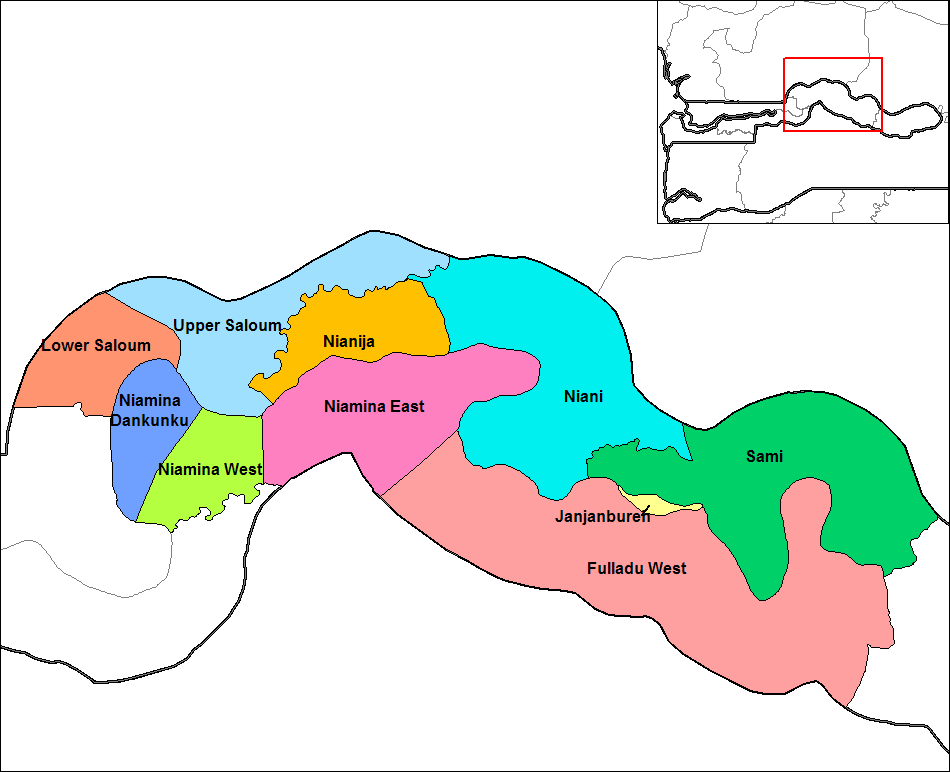
Districts of Central River Division

Sami District is one of the districts of the Central River Division of the Gambia. In the 2013 census, it had a population of 24,429.
