= Niamina Dankunku =

District of the Gambia

Coordinates: 13°35′N 15°20′W

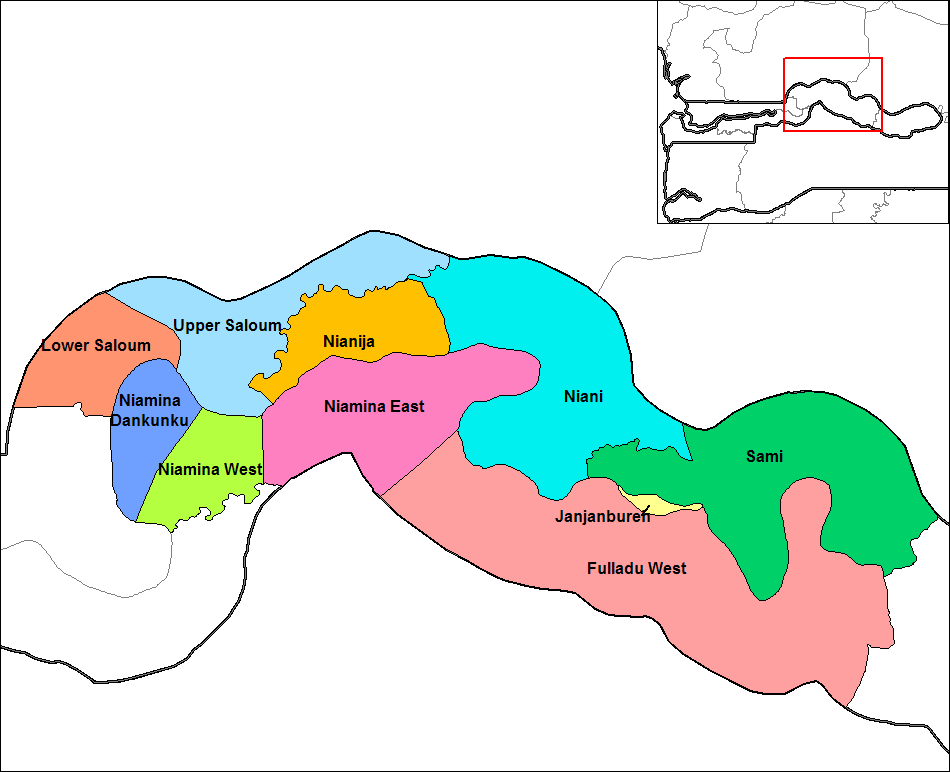
Districts of Central River Division

Niamina Dankunku is one of the ten districts of the Central River Division of the Gambia.

Kebba Ceesay, the former director-general of the National Intelligence Agency of Gambia, was the chief of Niamina Dankunku until his death in 2009. The first solar-powered street lights were installed in Niamina Dankunku village in 2021.
