= Jarra Central =

District of the Gambia

Coordinates: 13°25′N 15°25′W

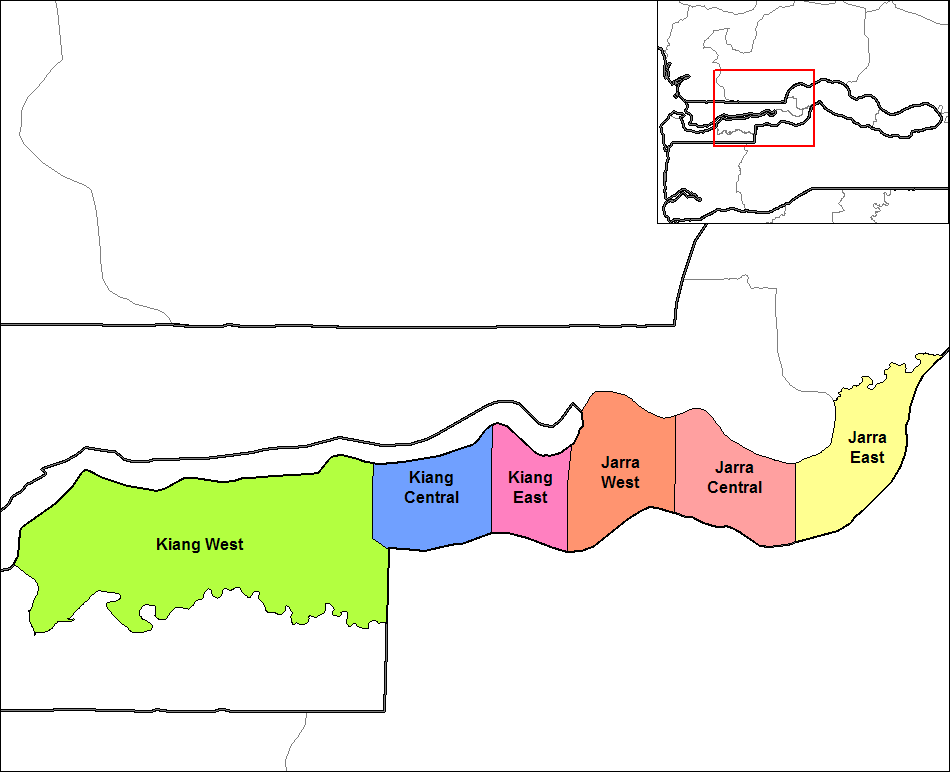
Districts of Lower River Division

Jarra Central is one of the six districts of the Lower River Division of the Gambia. In the 2013, it had a population of 8,437.
