= Niamina West =

District of the Central River Division in Gambia

Coordinates: 13°35′N 15°15′W

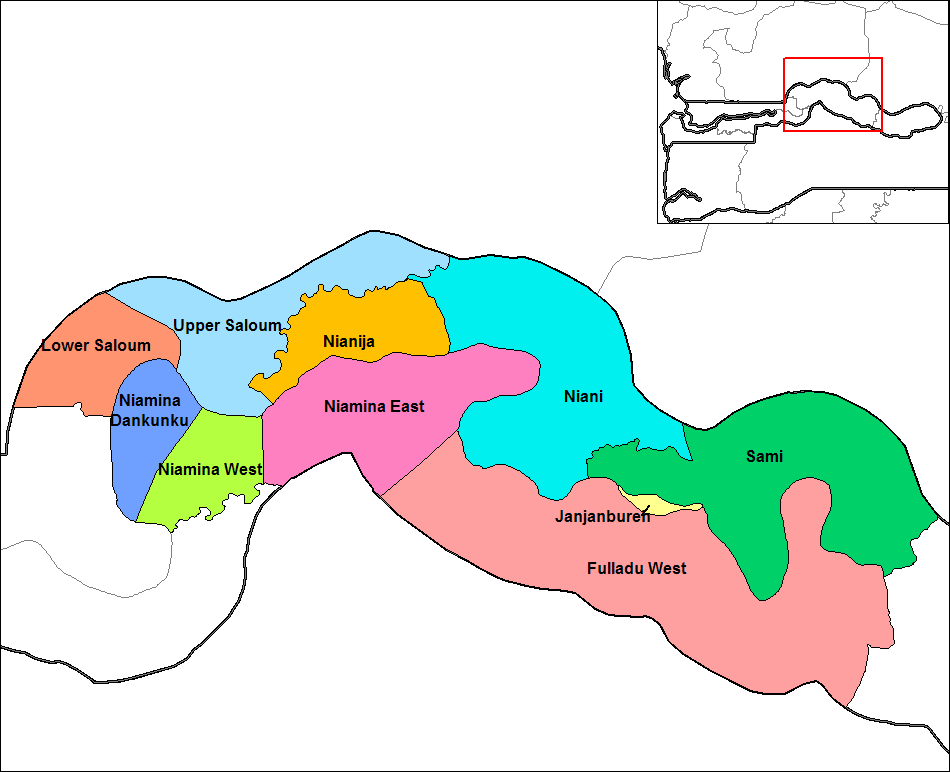
Districts of Central River Division

Niamina West is one of the ten districts of the Central River Division in the Gambia. In the 2013 census, it had a population of 7,293.
