= Mansa Konko =

- Location in the Gambia
- Coordinates: 13°28′N 15°33′W
- Country: The Gambia
- Local Government Area: Mansa Konko
- District: Jarra West

Mansa Konko or Mansakonko is a town in the Gambia, lying north of Soma. Formerly the home of an important chief. Mansa Konko translates as "the hill of kings" in Mandinka. It was later an administrative centre under the British, from which time some buildings survive.

The town is the seat of the Mansa Konko Local Government Area, formerly the Lower River Division. According to the 2013 census, the Mansa Konko LGA has 82,201 residents.
