= Niani District =

District of the Gambia

Coordinates: 13°40′N 14°55′W

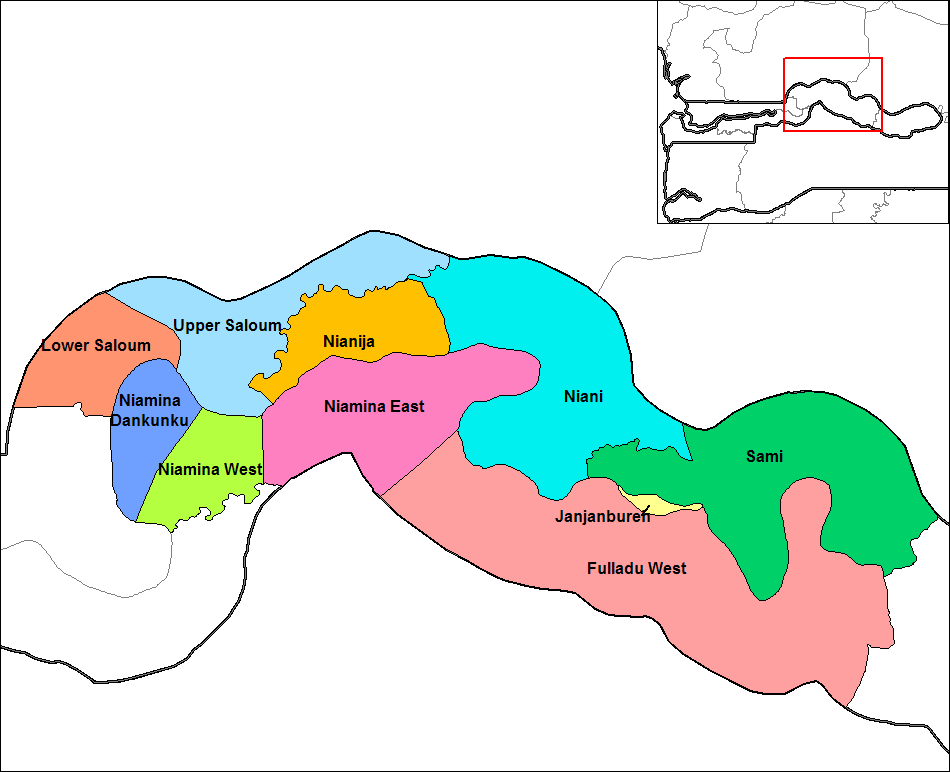
Districts of Central River Division

Niani District is one of the ten districts of the Central River Division of the Gambia. It is named after the Kingdom of Niani, a pre-colonial Mandinka state. Niani is a district located on the north bank of the Gambia River, in the Central River Region of the Gambia
