= Kuntaur =

Town in the Gambia

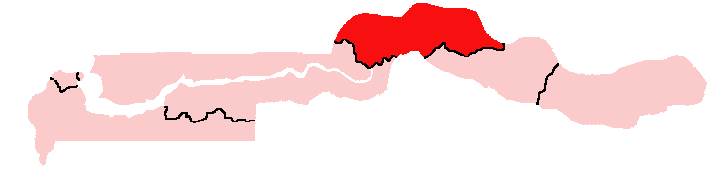
- Location of the Kuntaur Local Government Area

- Location in the Gambia
- Coordinates: 13°40′N 14°53′W
- Country: The Gambia
- Local Government Area: Kuntaur
- District: Niani

Kuntaur is a town located in central part of the Gambia.

According to the 2013 census, there are 3074 inhabitants. The town is the seat of the Kuntaur Local Government Area in the district of Niani (the western half of the former Central River Division), which has a population of 98,966.

== Geography ==
Kuntaur lies on the north bank of the Gambia River, about three kilometres south of Wassu and 13 kilometres north of Janjanbureh. The North Bank Road, an important highway crosses Wassu, where the well-known Wassu stone circles are located.

== Cultural sights ==
The Senegambian stone circles which are regarded as a place of worship among the Serer are not far from the area.

== Economy and infrastructure ==
Located about 248 kilometres from the river mouth to the Atlantic Ocean, the town is the last inland port that can be navigated by large commercial ships. This port is a major transit point for peanuts and peanut related products. The Gambia Produce Marketing Board has operated a peanut decorticating plant in Kuntaur since 1956 and is the town’s largest employer.

Kuntaur has had a market since 1920, which stimulated trade and population growth.
