= Kerewan =

Town in the Gambia

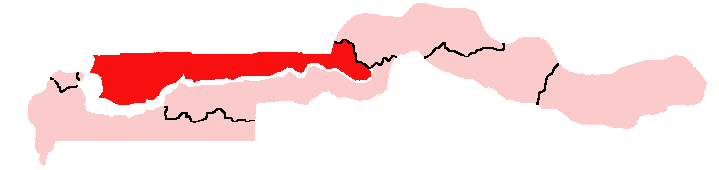
- Location of the Kerewan Local Government Area

- Location in the Gambia
- Coordinates: 13°30′N 16°05′W
- Country: The Gambia
- Division: North Bank Division

Kerewan is a town in the Gambia. Located beside the Miniminiyang Bolong, about 60 km from the capital Banjul. It is the seat of the Kerewan Local Government Area (formerly the North Bank Division), located on the north bank of the lower river Gambia.

The population of the Kerewan LGA was 225,516 at the 2013 population census, with about 3,500 people in Kerewan town.

== History ==
Kerewan was founded in the second half of the 19th century by the prominent Fatty family from the village of Katchang.

== Climate ==
Climate data for Kerewan (1991–2020)
Month	Jan	Feb	Mar	Apr	May	Jun	Jul	Aug	Sep	Oct	Nov	Dec	Year
Mean daily maximum °C (°F)	34.4 (93.9)	36.5 (97.7)	38.5 (101.3)	39.1 (102.4)	38.1 (100.6)	35.9 (96.6)	33.0 (91.4)	—	32.2 (90.0)	33.9 (93.0)	35.4 (95.7)	34.7 (94.5)	—
Daily mean °C (°F)	25.0 (77.0)	26.3 (79.3)	28.2 (82.8)	29.0 (84.2)	29.2 (84.6)	29.1 (84.4)	27.9 (82.2)	—	27.4 (81.3)	28.3 (82.9)	27.5 (81.5)	25.9 (78.6)	—
Mean daily minimum °C (°F)	15.6 (60.1)	16.5 (61.7)	18.1 (64.6)	19.0 (66.2)	20.3 (68.5)	22.5 (72.5)	22.6 (72.7)	22.8 (73.0)	22.6 (72.7)	22.7 (72.9)	19.5 (67.1)	16.9 (62.4)	19.9 (67.8)
Average precipitation mm (inches)	0.5 (0.02)	0.8 (0.03)	0.0 (0.0)	0.0 (0.0)	2.2 (0.09)	77.7 (3.06)	197.1 (7.76)	295.0 (11.61)	226.8 (8.93)	74.5 (2.93)	0.0 (0.0)	0.1 (0.00)	874.7 (34.44)
Average precipitation days (≥ 1.0 mm)	0.1	0.2	0.0	0.0	0.2	3.9	11.7	16.0	14.2	4.7	0.0	0.0	51.0
Source: NOAA
