= Central River Division =

Administrative division of the Gambia

Central River
- Region
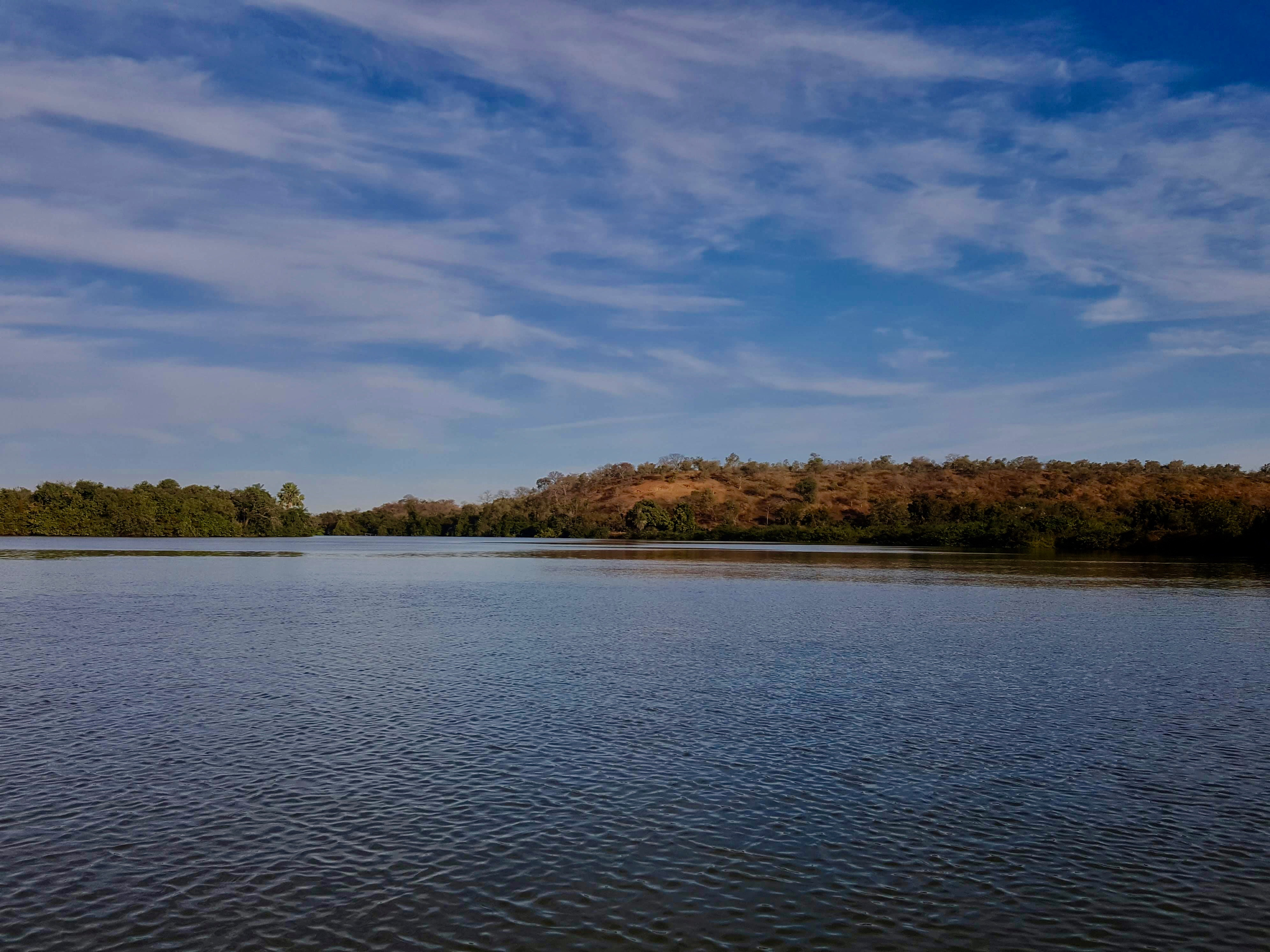

- Location of Central River Division in the Gambia
- Coordinates: 13°34′N 14°47′W
- Country: Gambia
- Capital: Janjanbureh

Area
  - Total: 2,894.3 km^{2} (1,117.5 sq mi)

Population (2013 census)
  - Total: 226,018
  - Density: 78.091/km^{2} (202.25/sq mi)
- Area code: (+220) 5

Central River is the largest of the five regions of the Gambia. Its capital is Janjanbureh (formerly Georgetown), on MacCarthy Island. The largest settlement is Bansang, with an estimated population in 2008 of 8,381.

Until 1995 the division was known as MacCarthy Island Division, which had been established as one of five administrative areas of Gambia Protectorate in the early 20th century. It is located on both sides of the Gambia River, and its total population according to the 2013 census is 226,018. The total number of households is 17,399 as of 2003. As of 2003, the total area of the region is 2894.3 km^{2}.

== Geography ==
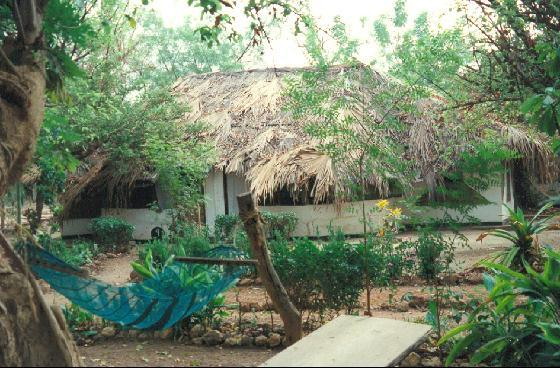
Hut in the province

The Gambia is the smallest country in Africa and the width of the strip like structure never exceeding 48 km (30 mi). It is bordered by Atlantic Ocean to the West, and otherwise surrounded by Senegal. The Gambia River flows throughout the country and is the principal source of water and transport medium. The banks of the river have swampy beaches, while it has alluvial soil in all other parts, which is conducive for the growth of rice. Peanuts is the major cashcrop. The weather is usually warm and dry. The elevation of the country reaches to a maximum of 50 m (160 ft) above the mean sea level. There are vast segments of sedimentary sandstone and claystone in the valleys of the rivers and the regions surrounding it. The river flows from Guinea and has an east-west axis. The shallow water in the coastline are important sources of fishing. There are mangrove and banto forests along the coastline. Over the river segment of 487 km (303 mi), there are numerous creeks, which are locally called boloons. The months from June to September experience a wet season, while the remaining seven months are dry. The average annual rainfall is around 1,400 mm (55 in) in the south east, while it is 720 mm (28 in) in the northwest. Experts have assessed that the overall rainfall during the century period between 1886 and 1992, there has been a reduction in rainfall of around 15-20 per cent and the wet season has been shortened.

== Demographics ==
Per 2013 census, the region had a population of 226,018 with a population density of 078. The total number of households is 17,399 as of 2003. As of 2003, the total area of the region is 2894.3 km^{2}. The infant mortality rate is 92 for every thousand births and the under-five mortality is 138 per every thousand births. The poverty gap ratio is 36.45 per cent as of 2003. The literacy rate of the province is 56 compared to a national average of 62.9 per cent. The net enrollment ratio in primary education is 53 per cent, children entering first grade of primary school reaching last grade of primary education is per cent and the ratios of boys against girls in primary, secondary and tertiary education is as of 2007.

== Districts ==
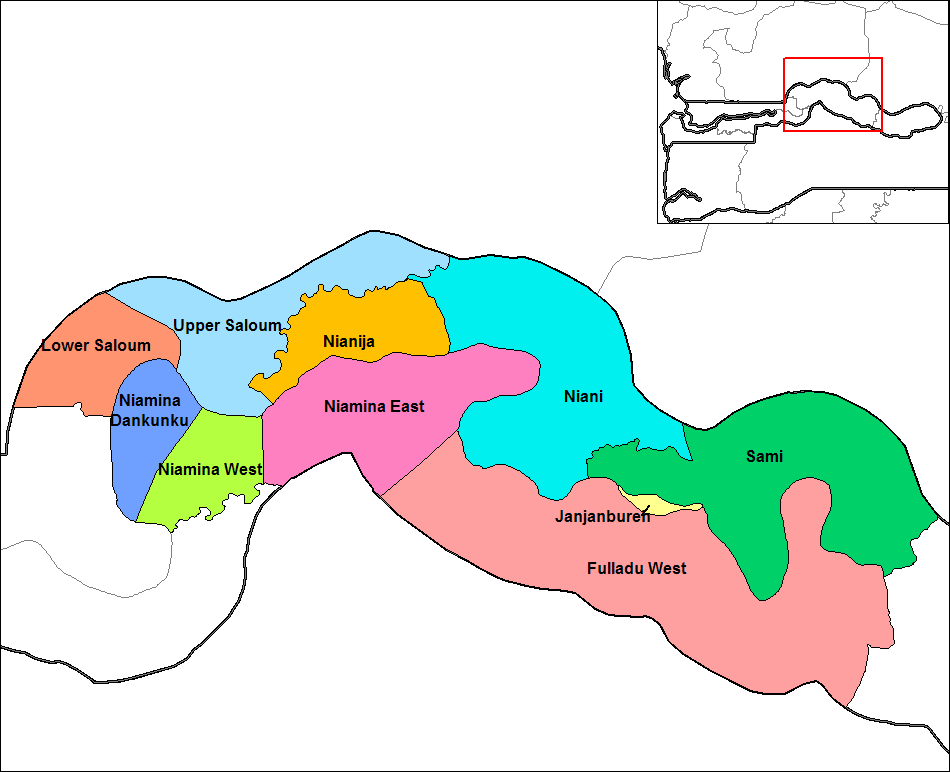
Districts of Central River

The Gambia along with modern-day Senegal were colonies of French and British until 1894 when it became a British colony. Both the countries got independence in 1965 and operated in a federation called Senegambia from 1982. During 1989, the confederation collapsed. In a bloodless coup, Lieutenant Yahya Jamme in 1994 and went on to win multi party elections in three subsequent elections. He has also defeated coups successfully and unlike the West African countries, the Gambia has a relative stable governance. The Local Government Act passed in 2002 superseded the previous local government acts like Local Government Act (Amended 1984), Local Government (City of Banjul) Act (Amended 1988), The Kanifing Municipal Council Act 1991 and the Provinces Act. There were seven local governments defined each subdivided into districts and wards. The Mayor who is the chairperson of the council and the council members of each council is elected by people of the area. The legislations indicating the roles were not clearly defined, but the council is responsible for finance, services and planning for each sector under it. Around 25 per cent of the budget is provisioned by the central government. The council also has a Alkalo or Seyfo representative, a Chief representative, a youth nominee, a woman nominee and other nominated members of local interest groups.

Central River is divided into 10 districts, namely, Fulladu West, Janjanbureh, Lower Saloum, Niamina Dankunku, Niamina East, Niamina West, Niani, Nianija, Sami and Upper Saloum. It has subsequently been divided into two Local Government Areas (Janjanbureh in the east and Kuntaur in the west), each containing five of the above districts. The city and area council elections were held during April 2002, when M.F.S. Malang Saibo Camara, an APRC candidate became the Mayor, winning 70.2 per cent votes. The council was led by Alliance for Patriotic Reorientation and Construction (APRC), which won 9 out of the 12 seats, National Reconciliation Party (NRP) won one seat and two seats were won by independents.

== See also ==
- Districts of the Gambia
