= Sand (surname) =

Sand is a Norwegian and German surname. Notable people with the surname include:

- Alexa Sand, American art historian
- Arvid Sand (born 1998), Swedish actor
- Bjørn Sand (1928–2024), Norwegian revue writer and actor
- Cole Sand (born 2003), American actor
- Ebbe Sand (born 1972), Danish footballer
- Fredrik Frodesen Sand (1846–1919), Norwegian politician
- George Sand (1804–1876), French novelist and memoirist
- Gunnar Sand (1909–1983), Norwegian politician
- Harvey Sand (1927–2019), American politician from North Dakota
- Heinie Sand (1897–1958), American baseball player
- Ida Sand (born 1977), Swedish jazz singer and pianist
- Jon Ola Sand (born 1961), Norwegian television executive
- Jordan Sand, American Japanologist
- José Sand (born 1980), Argentine footballer
- Julia Sand (1848–1933), American correspondent of President Chester A. Arthur
- Karl Ludwig Sand (1795–1820), German student and executed murderer
- Kirsten Sand (1895–1996), Norwegian architect
- Lauritz Sand (1879–1956), Norwegian resistance member
- Leonard B. Sand (1928–2016), American judge from New York
- Loui Sand (born 1992), Swedish handball player
- Mandy Sand (1932–2004), Israeli artist
- Marc Sand (born 1988), Austrian footballer
- Maurice Sand (1823–1889), French illustrator and writer
- Monique Sand (born 1944), French ballet dancer
- Nancy Sand (born 1964), Argentine politician
- Nicholas Sand, American clandestine chemist
- O. Normann Sand (1921–1974), Norwegian politician
- Paul Sand (born 1932), American actor and comedian
- Paul M. Sand (1914–1984), American judge from North Dakota
- Peter Sand (born 1972), Danish football player, twin brother of Ebbe Sand
- René Sand (1877–1953), Belgian doctor
- Rob Sand (born 1982), American politician from Iowa
- Rolf Sand (1920–2018), Norwegian actor, half-brother of Bjørn Sand
- Roxana Sand (born c.1916), American erotic dancer
- Shauna Sand (born 1971), American actress and model
- Shlomo Sand (born 1946), Israeli historian and academic
- Susan Bianchi-Sand (born 1947), American unionist
- Svein Sand, Norwegian handball player
- Todd Sand (born 1963), American pair skater
- Ulf Sand (1938–2014), Norwegian politician
- Vebjørn Sand (born 1966), Norwegian artist

== See also ==
- Zand (surname)
- Sanda (surname)
- Sande (surname)
- Sandi (surname)
- Sando (surname)
- Sandu
- Sands (surname)
- Sandy (surname)
- Christopher Sandius
