= Sandu =

Sandu may refer to:

== People ==
=== Surname ===
- Adrian Sandu (born 1966), Romanian gymnast
- Bianca Sandu (born 1992), Romanian footballer
- Constantin Sandu (born 1993), Moldovan footballer
- Corina Sandu, Romanian-American mechanical engineer
- Cristina Sandu (born 1990), Romanian long jumper and triple jumper
- Daniel Sandu (born 2007), Romanian footballer
- Florin Sandu (born 1987), Romanian footballer
- Florin Sandu (lawyer) (born 1949), Romanian lawyer and academic and former chief of the Romanian Police
- Gabriel Sandu (born 1963), Romanian economist and politician
- Gabriel Sandu (footballer) (1952–1998), Romanian football defender
- Iddris Sandu (born 1997), Ghanaian-American software engineer
- Ion Sandu (born 1993), Moldovan footballer
- Maia Sandu (born 1972), Moldovan politician and president of the country
- Marian Sandu (born 1972), Romanian Greco-Roman wrestler
- Mihaela Sandu (born 1977), Romanian chess player
- Mihai Gruia Sandu (born 1956), Romanian actor, playwright, and director
- Mircea Sandu (born 1952), Romanian footballer
- Raluca Sandu (born 1980), Romanian tennis and padel player
- Roco Sandu (born 1966), Romanian footballer

=== Given name ===
- Sandu Boc, or Alexandru Boc (born 1946), Romanian footballer
- Sandu Ciorba, Romanian Roma singer
- Sandu Ciorăscu (born 1966), Romanian rugby union football player
- Sandu Florea (born 1946), Romanian-American comic book and comic strip creator
- Sandu Iovu (born 1996), Romanian footballer
- Sandu Mitrofan (born 1952), Romanian bobsledder
- Sandu Negrean (born 1974), Romanian footballer
- Sandu Popescu (born 1956), Romanian-British physicist
- Sandu Tudor (1896–1962), Romanian poet, journalist, theologian, and Orthodox monk
- Sandu Tăbârcă (born 1965), Romanian football player and manager

== Places ==
=== China ===
- Sandu Shui Autonomous County (三都水族自治县), Guizhou

Towns (三都镇)

- Sandu, Fujian, in Jiaocheng District, Ningde
- Sandu, Guangxi, in Liujiang County
- Sandu, Hainan, in Danzhou
- Sandu, Leiyang, in Leiyang, Hunan
- Sandu, Zixing, in Zixing, Hunan
- Sandu, Jiangxi, in Tonggu County
- Sandu, Jiande, in Jiande, Zhejiang

Townships (三都乡)

- Sandu Township, Shanxi, a township-level division of Shanxi
- Sandu Township, Zhejiang, in Songyang County

=== Gambia ===
- Sandu District

== Other uses ==
- South African National Defence Union, a trade union
- "Sandu", a jazz standard by Clifford Brown

== See also ==
- SANDU v Minister of Defence (disambiguation)
- Sandhu, a Jatt clan
