= Maja Melandsø =

Norwegian architect (1906–1981)

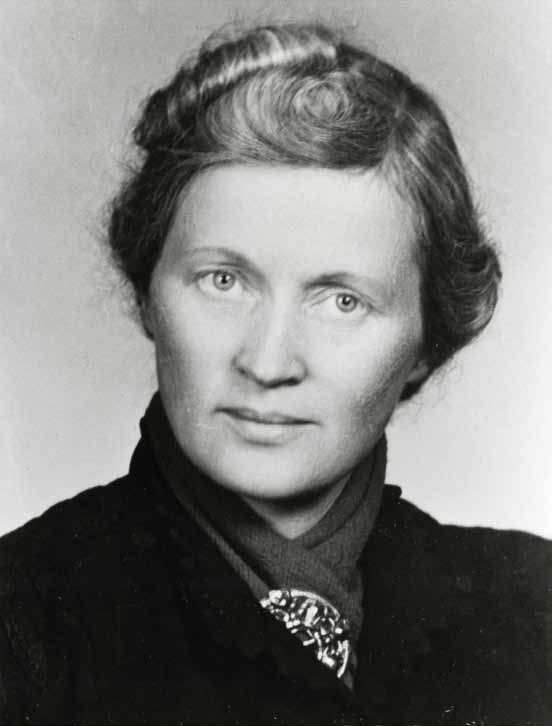
- Maja Melandsø, 1942
- Born: Marie Sofie Melandsø; 14 January 1906; Trondheim, Norway
- Died: 2 December 1981 (aged 75); Trondheim, Norway
- Occupation: Architect
- Spouse: Ingo Kaul (m. 1933–1946)

Maja Melandsø (born Marie Sofie Melandsø; 14 January 1906 – 12 December 1981) was a Norwegian architect and painter. She was a pioneer in several areas: she was one of the first women architects to complete their studies at the Norwegian Institute of Technology when she graduated in 1931, she is considered the person to introduce functionalist architecture in Trondheim, and she was one of the first Norwegian female architects with her own practice. Melandsø was involved both in residential construction as well as cultural heritage management. As an architect, she had an extensive output, but apart from the fact that as a newly qualified architect she attracted attention with her funkis-bygg ('functional buildings') in Trondheim, the buildings she designed were rarely mentioned in architectural literature.

I have designed houses, not buildings. Houses to work in, houses to live in, according to ability. Whether health centers, manor houses, schools, business premises, or houses to live in, they were built on the principle that one square meter too much is as bad as one square meter too little. The houses were big on the inside and small on the outside. I have never recognized the concept of "facade"; all three dimensions are equally important.

— Maja Melandsø

== Upbringing and studies ==
Maja Melandsø was the eleventh of twelve siblings. Her mother was a housewife, while her father, Johan Melandsø, was a merchant. He established his own business in Trondheim, as a wholesaler for hardware stores.

Melandsø originally wanted to become an artist. After taking her examen artium in liberal arts at Trondheim Cathedral School in 1925, she traveled to Paris where she was a student of Per Krohg in 1926–1927. Her mother was opposed to her plans to become an artist. She insisted that a woman must have a "proper" education and be able to support herself and thought that architecture would be a good choice: "We need female architects, men are so impractical".

After Melandsø supplemented her examen artium with technical education (realfag) and did an apprenticeship as a bricklayer, she began studies in the architecture department of the Norwegian Institute of Technology (Norwegian: Norges tekniske høgskole, NTH) in the fall of 1927 as the only woman in her class. She later looked back with joy at the breakthrough of functionalism at the time with a new aesthetic that inspired both her and her fellow students.

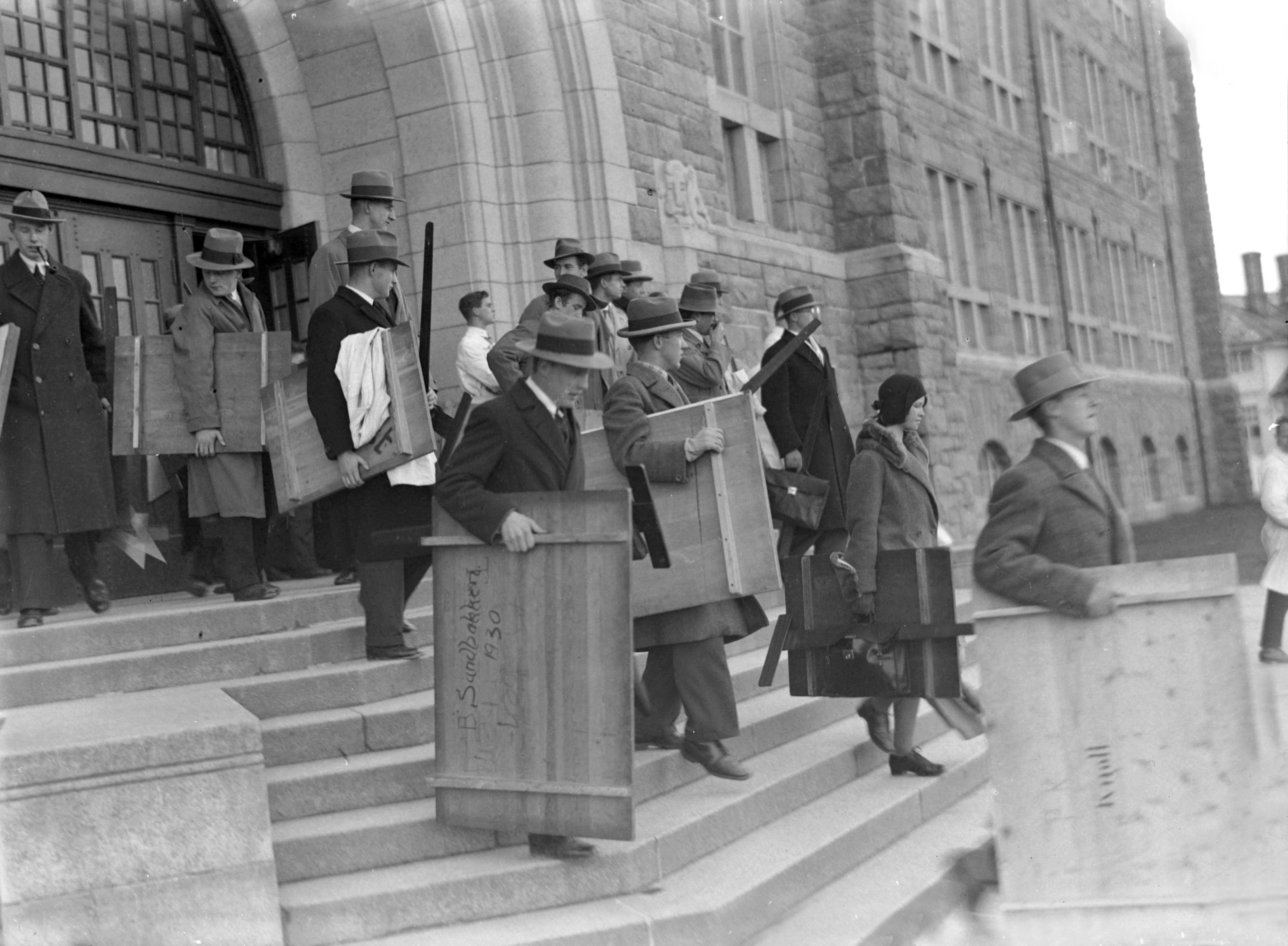
Architecture students taking their drawing boards and T-squares and going on strike as a reaction to the expulsion of Tønnes Søyland. Melandsø second from right. Credit: Schrøder/TFM–SVB

Until that time, education in the architecture department was based on the Beaux-Arts tradition and classical ideals. The students would now receive an education they felt was more societally relevant. One student, Tønnes Søyland, wrote an article in the magazine Byggekunst in the autumn of 1930, in which he, among other things, characterized one of the departments as unprofessional and the management of the department as irresponsible. Søyland was then expelled for three months.

His classmates, including Melandsø, reacted with a spontaneous strike, which was covered both by the student newspaper Under Dusken and the city's newspapers. The strike led to discussion between students and instructors, and also to a new study program, which was more in line with what the students had been looking for: more connection between aesthetic and technical subjects, and more society-related tasks. Graduate theses from this time show strong inspiration from functionalism.

For a short time during her studies, Melandsø was an assistant to professor Sverre Pedersen. He was also her advisor during her thesis project. Pedersen had been behind the planning and design of several major housing projects in Trondheim, and the theme of Melandsø's thesis was to design a residential area. Two drawings from her thesis are published at DigitaltMuseum.

During her studies, she went with Professor Pedersen and other graduate students on an excursion to Berlin to study modern residential architecture. In Berlin the large exhibition Deutsche Bauausstellung 1931 was taking place. The housing section of the exhibition, "Wohnung unserer Zeit" ('dwellings of our time'), was designed by several of the most important representatives of modern architecture, including Ludwig Mies van der Rohe and Walter Gropius. The exhibition made an impression on the young Melandsø. She designed her graduate thesis while she was in Berlin, about which she wrote: "... in the shadow of 'Interbau', the city of the future that the leading architects of the time had joined forces to build". In Berlin she met the young German Eugen "Ingo" Kaul. Kaul was the press officer for the Berliner Ausstellungs- und Messe-Amt, which organized the building and architecture exhibition. He would become her husband two years later.

When she finished her education in 1931, it was as the fifth woman to receive an architecture degree from NTH. The first four were Kirsten Sand (graduated in 1915); Elsa E. G. Andersen (1917); Kirsten M. Røsberg (1919) and Ingeborg Tønnessen (1929).

== Trondheim's first funkisbygg ==
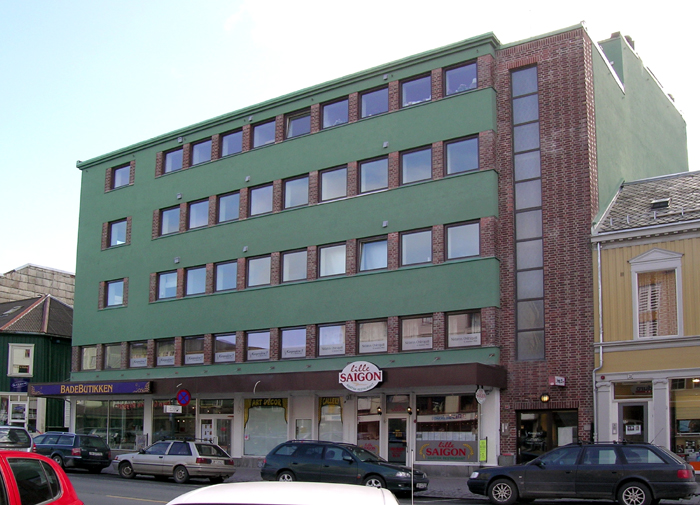
Melandsøgården at Fjordgaten 25, Trondheim (1932) Credit: Jensens

Melandsø designed what is considered the first example of functionalist architecture in Trondheim. The same year she completed her education at NTH, her father's business in Trondheim, Johan Melandsø & Co. burnt to the ground. It was a two-storey wood building at Fjordgaten 25. He gave his newly educated daughter the task of designing new business premises at the same location. It would be a five-storey concrete and brick building which still towers above the low three-storey houses in the neighborhood.

The property was designed according to new, modernist ideals. It had shops on the first floor and offices on the other four. The function of the building was expressed in the large glass panes of the shops – and the offices' horizontal rows of windows. The stairwell and a continuous pane of glass formed the vertical elements. Melandsøgården was completed in August 1932 and drew a lot of attention. The young architect was interviewed by the newspaper Dagbladet about her work, and the journalist felt she belonged among the most extreme modernists in architecture.

The city historian (byantikvar) in Trondheim has put Melandsøgården on the list of buildings that are deemed to be of particular interest or importance. It is also one of the buildings mentioned in Trondhjems Arkitektforenings ('Trondheim Association of Architects') architecture guide for Trondheim: Arkitektur i 1000 år.

== Via Oslo to Berlin ==
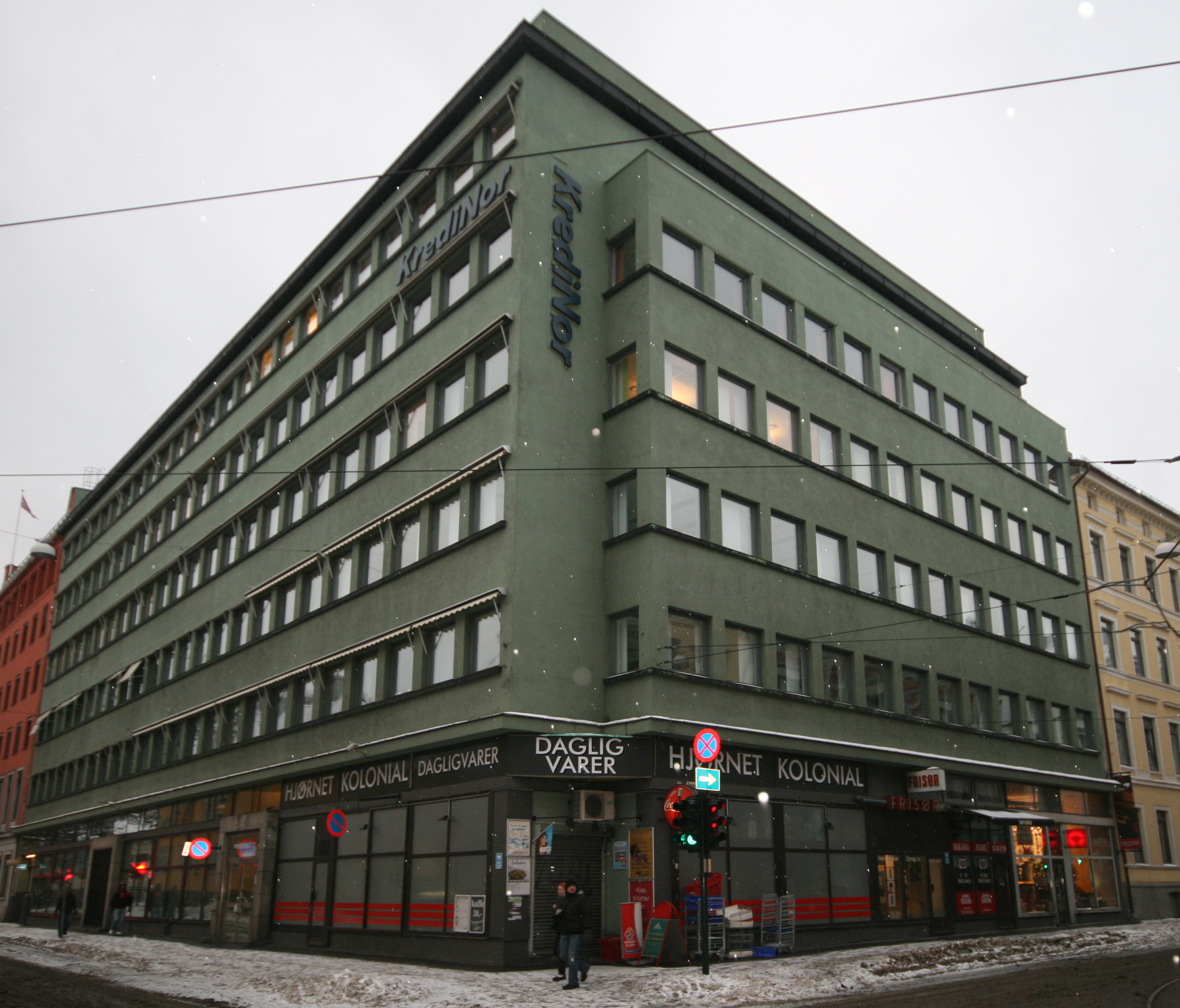
De-No-Fa-gården Architect: O. Eindride Slaatto Credit: GAD

In 1932, before Melandsøgården was officially opened, Melandsø moved to Oslo and worked for a year with architect O. Eindride Slaatto. She gained more experience with functionalist ideas and functionalist architecture in practice. Slaatto was one of the most successful Norwegian architects of his time. In 1933 he was awarded the Houen Foundation Award for De-No-Fa-gården on Prinsens gate in Oslo.

In the autumn of 1933 she married Ingo Kaul, the young German who had been a guide for the Norwegians on the study trip two years earlier, and moved to Berlin with him. Through his work as press officer for the Berlin Messe-Amt, Kaul came into contact with several of Germany's famous architects, including Walter Gropius, the founder of Bauhaus. Melandsø also met some of these famous functionalists. She herself has told of a visit to Gropius' home.

Melandsø and her husband had five daughters in the course of eight years; four were born while they lived in Berlin. She was thus unable to have her own architectural practice while she was in Germany, but in 1936 she designed a clubhouse for the Norwegian Rowing Club in Berlin. The clubhouse was completed the following year. The house has now been extended, but the original three-storey building can still be seen, with reclining panels and gable roof: a simple building with an expression influenced by Norwegian building styles and slight functionalism.

== Back in Norway ==
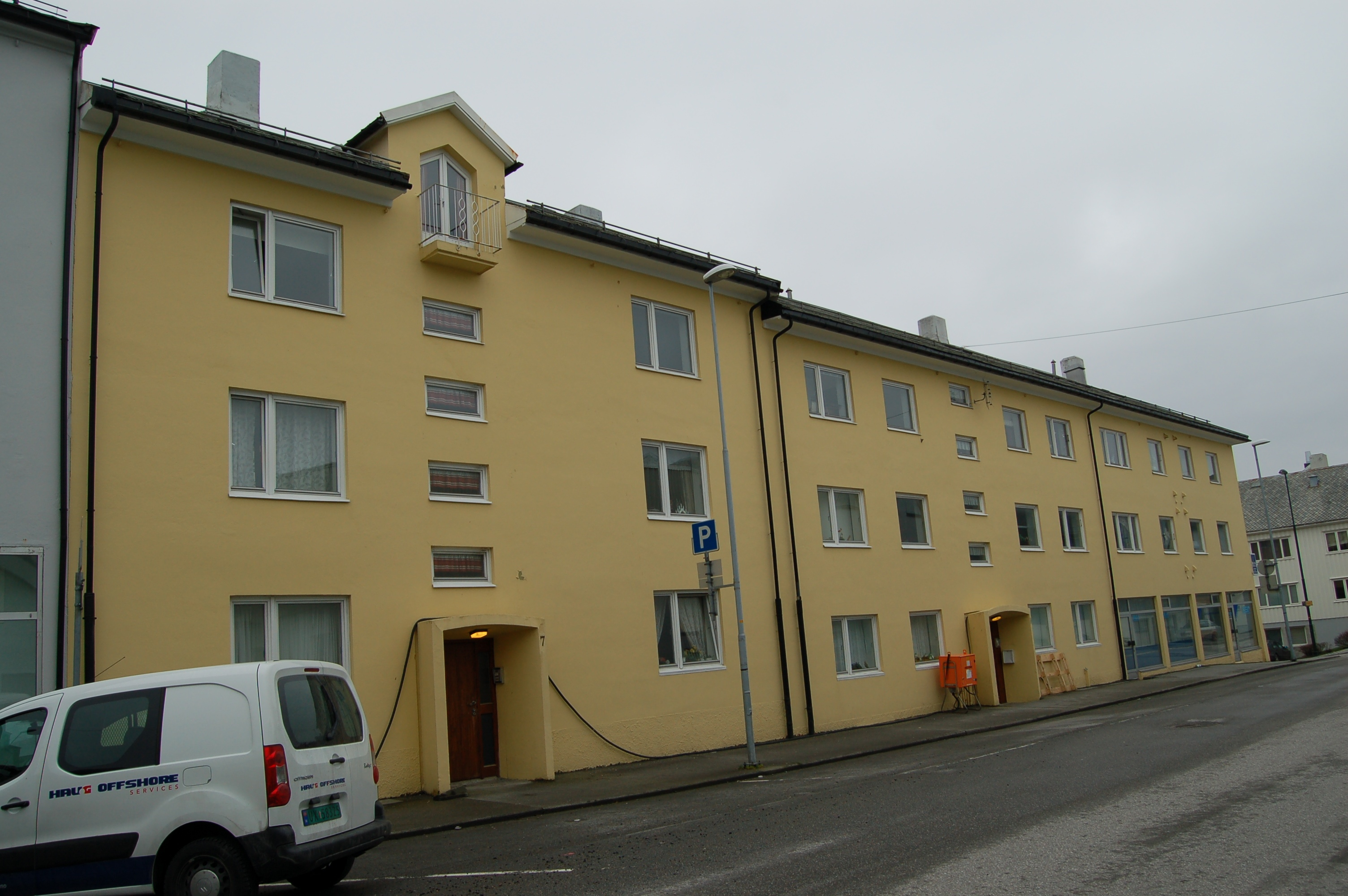
Residences for Kristiansund Boligbyggelag (1949) Credit: T. Carlsen

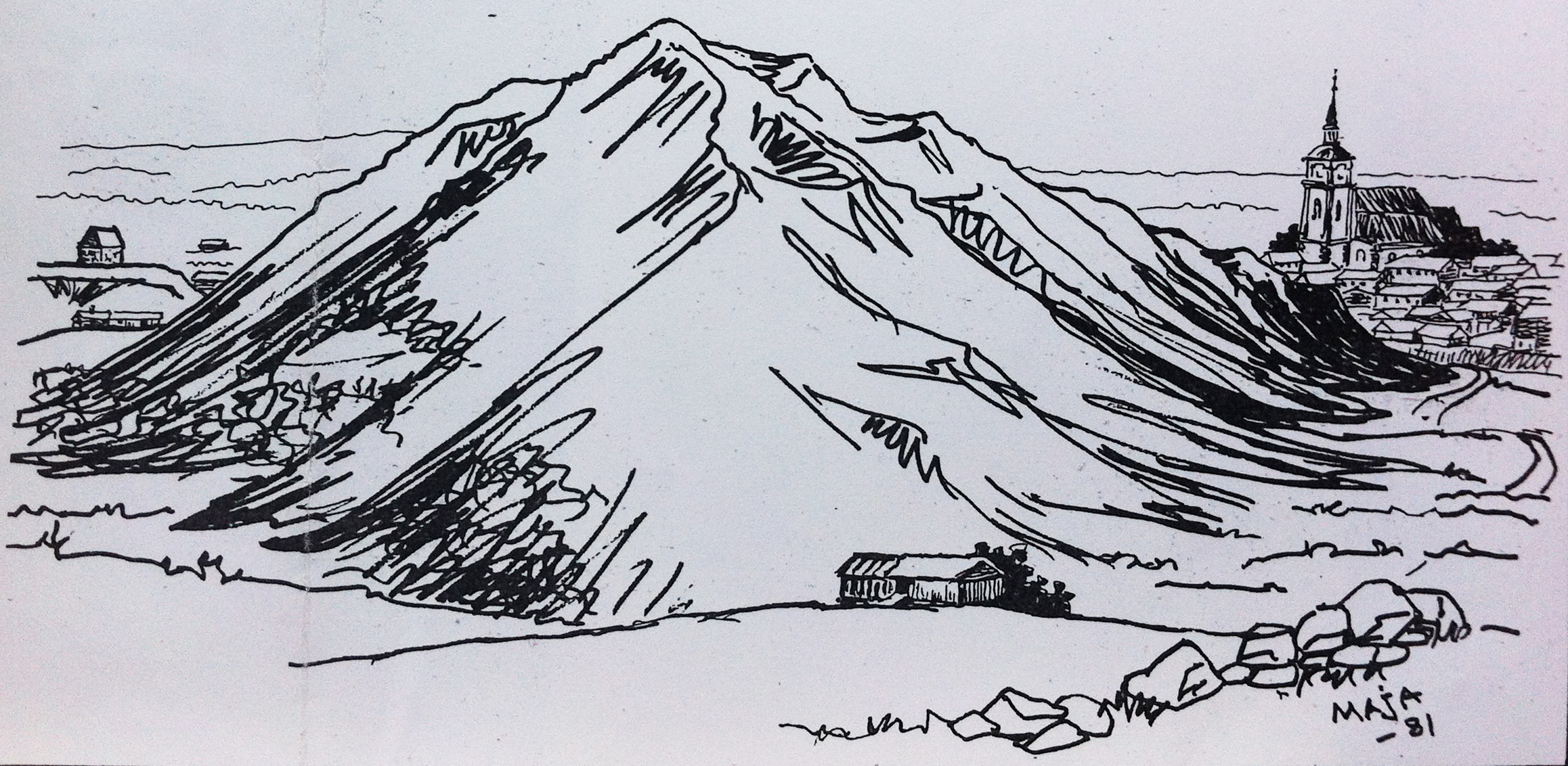
Sketch of slag heap at Røros. M. Melandsø (1981)

In 1939, the couple were in Norway to baptize their fourth daughter when Germany invaded Poland and World War II broke out. The other three daughters were brought from Berlin, and the family settled in Trondheim. From then on and for many years to come, Melandsø and the family had great problems as a result of her being married to a German man. This led to a divorce in 1946, in order to regain her Norwegian citizenship and thus residence and work permits in Norway.

Kaul was sent out of the country in 1947, and Melandsø was left alone to support herself and her five daughters. They moved to Kristiansund, which was almost razed by the German bombing in April 1940 and which had a great need for architects during reconstruction. In Kristiansund she first worked for the architect Austigard for about a year. After that she had her own practice for almost ten years and received a number of large jobs, leaving her mark on the center of Kristiansund in Gjenreisningsbyen. She was, according to Findal, the first female architect to work from home. In Kristiansund her designs included the so-called Løvoldbygget ('Løvold building'), with Svaneapoteket; her own house with office – and a larger revenue house for Kristiansund Boligbyggelag.

In 1956, Melandsø and her daughters moved again to Trøndelag. She got Haugmarka back, the home in Malvik Municipality which had been confiscated by the Directorate for Enemy Property, and started to work for the state architect in Sør-Trøndelag county, where she took on a variety of work. She designed manor houses, retirement homes, healthcare centers, schools, and residences.

In 1961–1963 she lived and worked in Sweden, including with architect Karl W. Ottesen. After that, she established her own practice in Trondheim. She had always been interested in designing good and affordable housing. Just after the war she had even developed a standard house, the "Maja house", but this was never put into production. From the 1960s onward, she designed several residences, in addition to other types of buildings.

She was committed to cultural heritage preservation, both in the preservation of the slag heaps and Småsetran in Røros Municipality, and in areas of Malvik Municipality where she lived much of her adult life. She was a dedicated person and wrote several articles and opinion pieces, both in Arkitektnytt and daily newspapers, often with her own illustrations.

Melandsø worked as an architect for 50 years. She was interested in functionalist architecture her entire life, but designed based on the users' needs: "houses to work in, houses to live in".

Melandsø's archive of designs was donated to the National Museum of Art, Architecture and Design's architecture collection.

== Selected work ==
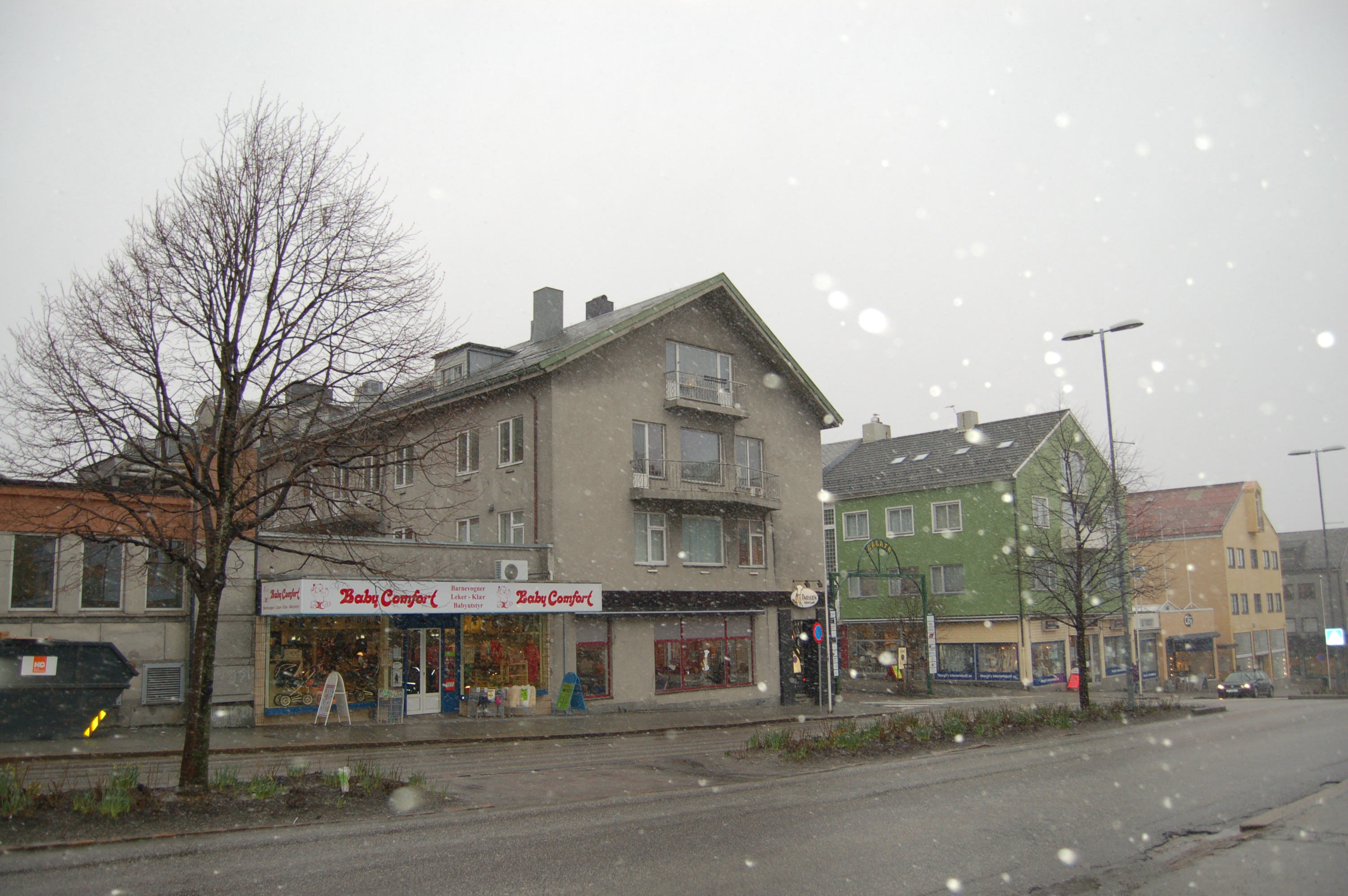
The grey building is Løvoldbygget in Kristiansund, built in 1950 Credit: T. Carlsen

- Melandsøgården, Trondheim, 1931–1932
- Clubhouse for the Norwegian Rowing Club, Berlin, 1936–1937
- Løvoldbygget with Svaneapoteket, Kristiansund, 1950
- Residences for Kristiansund Boligbyggelag, 1949
- Machinist residences in Rissa for S-Tr.lag E-verk, 1957–1958
- Bjugn manor, 1958–1959
- District doctor's residence, Støren, 1958–1959
- Jøssund retirement home (second stage of construction), Bjugn, 1959–1960
- Hitra healthcare center, Fillan, 1959–1960
- Strand school, Hitra, 1960–1961
- Single-family home for G. Stahl, Lysøysund, 1981
- Single-family home for Israelsson, Ranheim, 1981

== Artist and designer ==
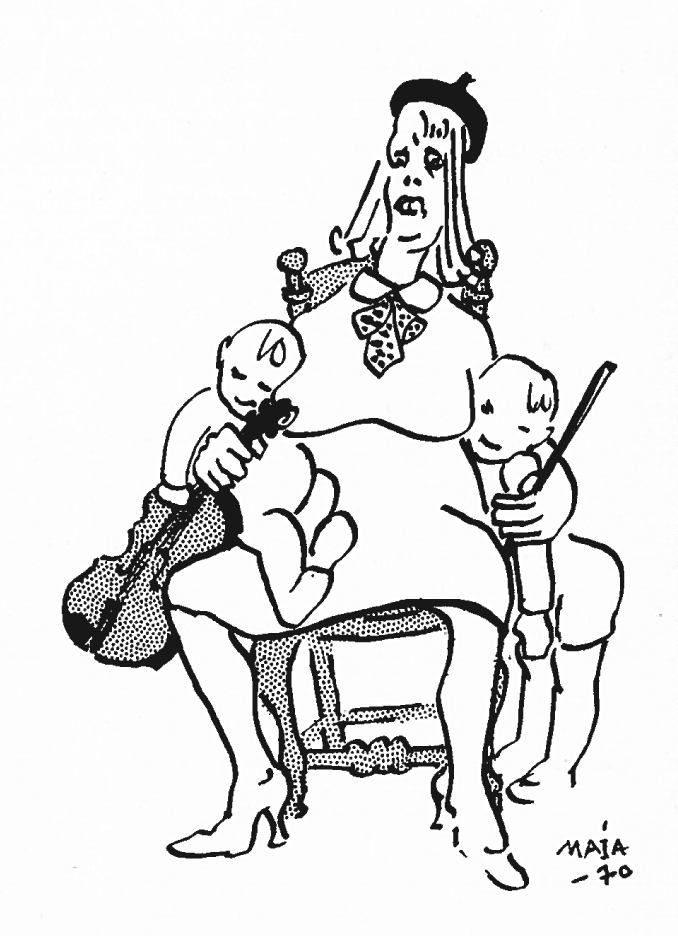
"Stakkar, hun er begavet", drawn by Maja Melandsø. The oldest version is dated 1950.

Melandsø was a gifted illustrator. During her studies at NTH she submitted several caricatures of professors and students to the student newspaper Under Dusken. For her effort she, as the first woman, was awarded the distinction Under Dusken's pen. She also continued to draw caricatures and illustrations later in life. While she worked with Slaatto, she had a side job as an artist for Dagbladet, where she made illustrations for theater reviews, among other things.

In 1932 she debuted as a painter at the exhibition Bildende kunstnerinners utstilling, which was arranged by Blomqvist art shop i Oslo. This exhibition, consisting of 88 female artists' work, received much press coverage. She also found time to paint after beginning her work as a privately practicing architect, but did not participate in any more exhibitions.

She also received decorative jobs while working as an architect. One of the larger ones was in the new Slaatto building designed in Ål in Hallingdal in 1933. In the courtroom she painted a large frieze that went around the four walls of the hall, at the top towards the sky. The frieze depicted the development of Norwegian law and justice through the ages. The courtroom has now been converted into smaller premises, but the frieze has been retained. In the municipal hall, she and Slaatto painted a frieze with nature motifs and a few historical elements.

In 1950 she published the book Sort og hvitt i ekteskapet ('Black and white in marriage'), with her own sometimes stark caricatures of relationships between women and men, in work and family situations.

Melandsø was creative in many areas. She wove tapestries and made silver jewelry.

Selection of the friezes in Ål
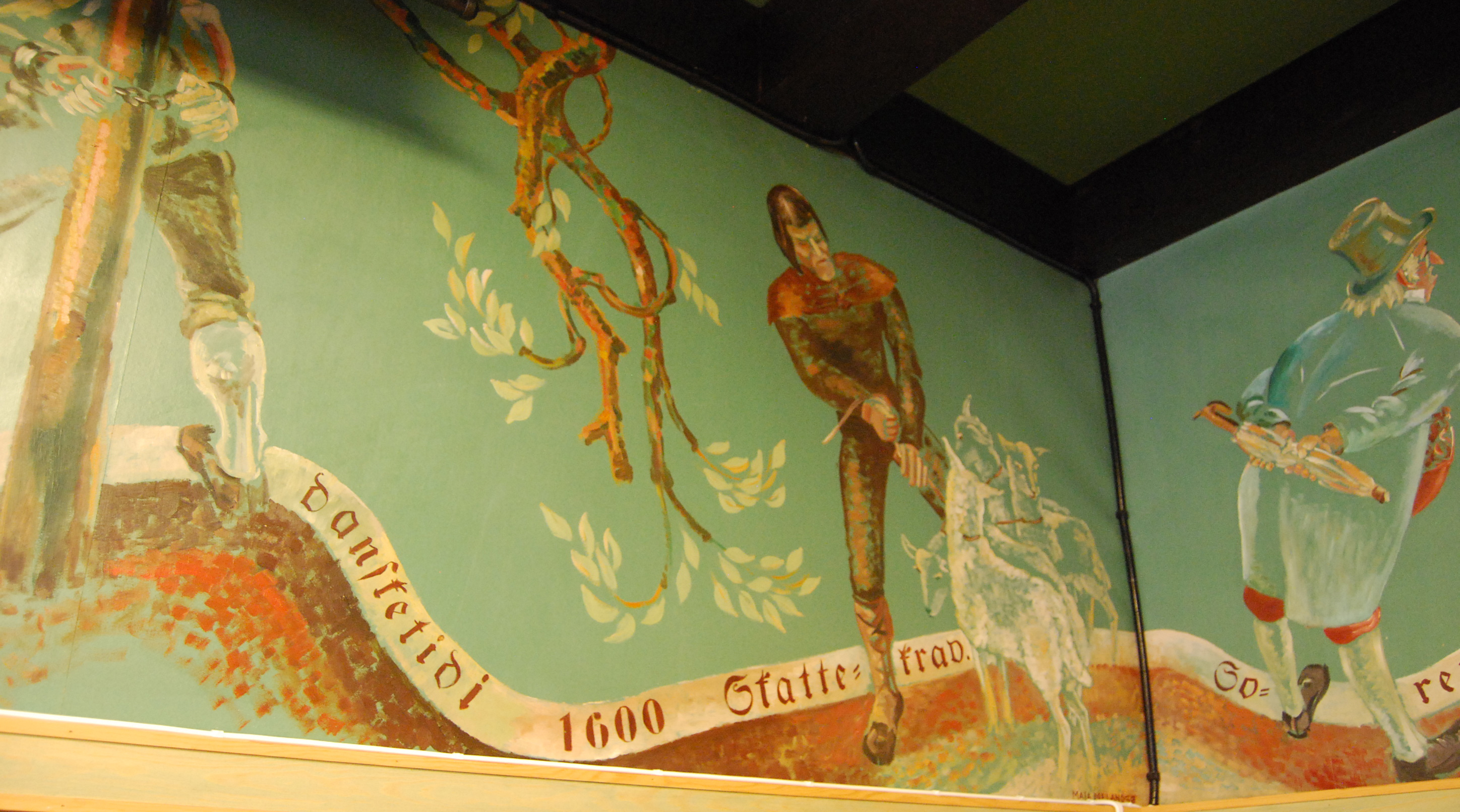
From the courtroom. Artist: Melandsø

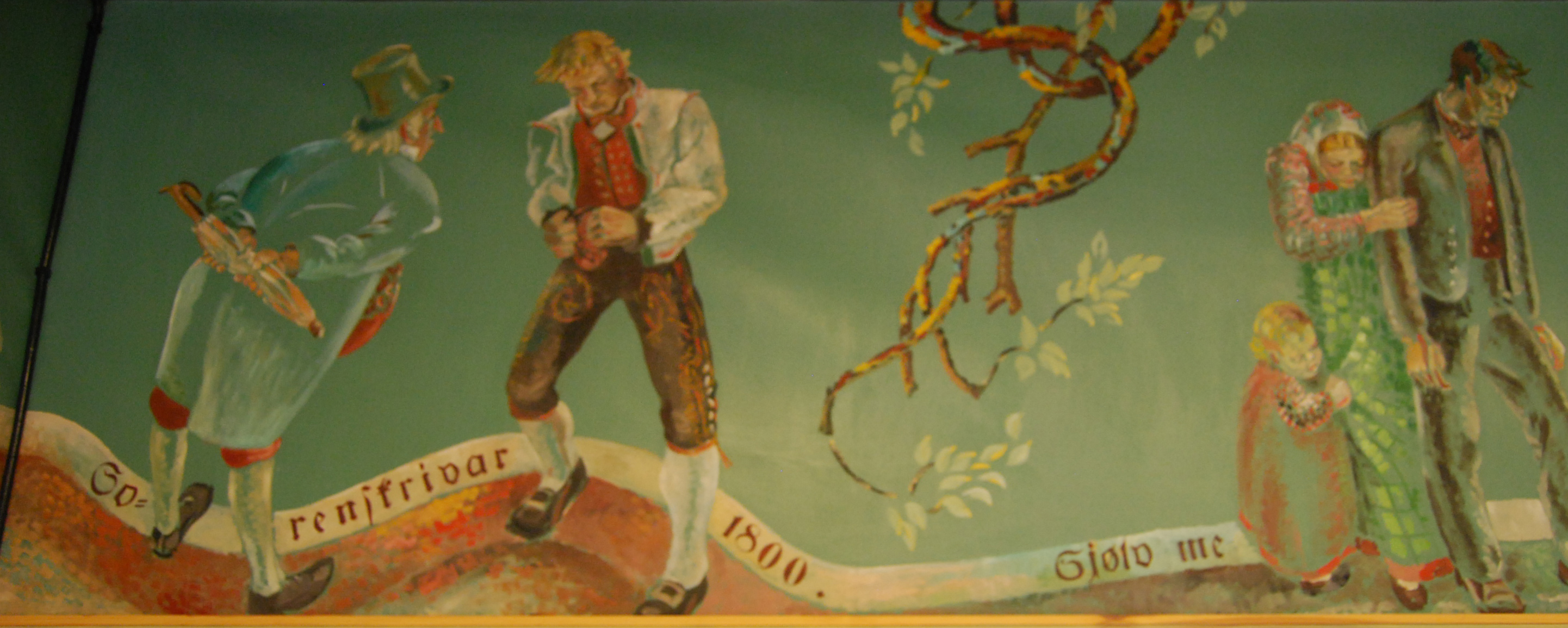
From the courtroom. Artist: Melandsø

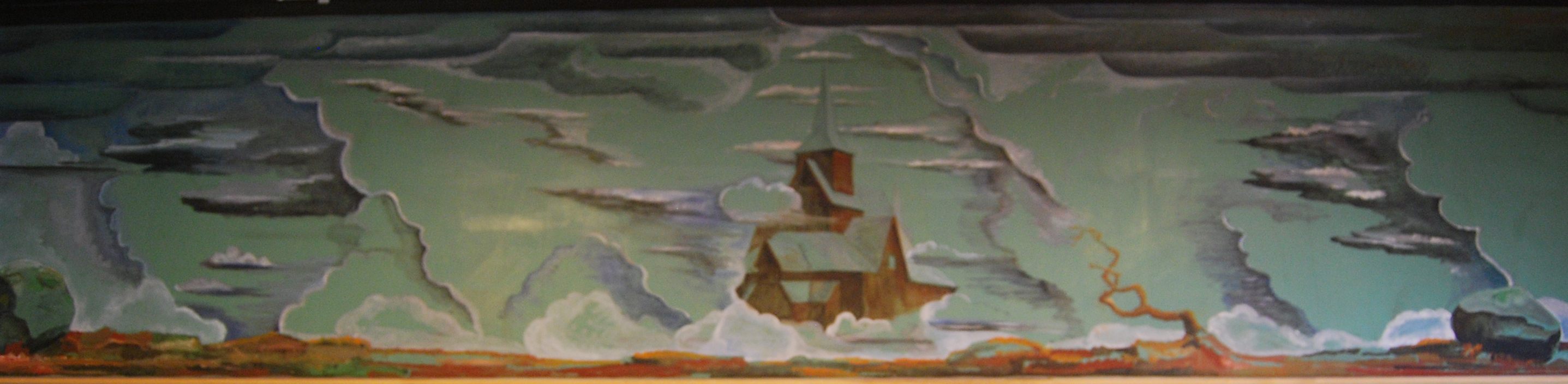
From the municipal boardroom. Artist: Melandsø/Slaatto

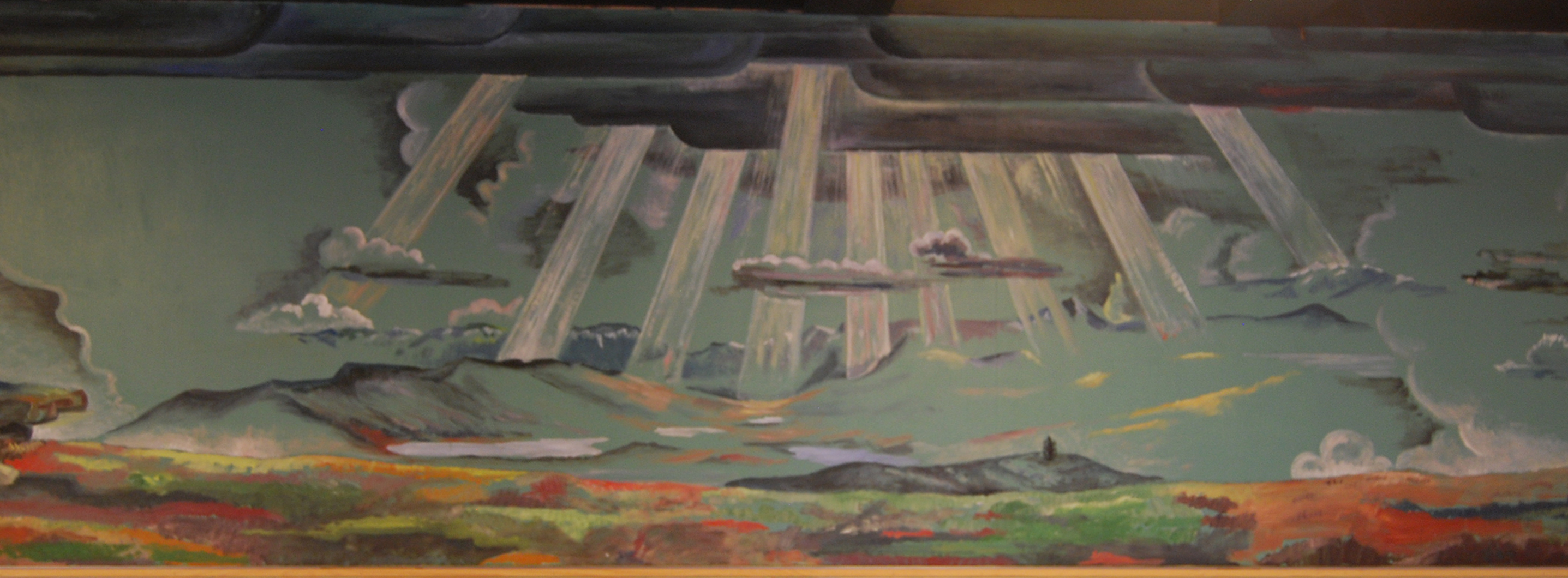
From the municipal boardroom. Artist: Melandsø/Slaatto

== See also ==
- Lilla Hansen, Norway's first female architect
- Hjørdis Grøntoft Raknerud, early Norwegian female architect
- Women in architecture
