= Bucks Music Group =

British independent music publisher

- Industry: Music & entertainment
- Founded: 1967
- Headquarters: London, United Kingdom
- Key people: Simon Platz, Managing Director
- Website: www.bucksmusicgroup.com

Bucks Music Group is an independent music publisher based in London, founded in 1967. In its early years the company worked with artists including David Bowie, Procol Harum, Black Sabbath, the Rolling Stones and T. Rex. It is run by managing director Simon Platz. Their catalogue includes works written by David Bowie, The Rolling Stones, Black Sabbath, Procol Harum, DJ Fresh, Run The Jewels, James Blunt, Professor Green, Rudimental, Beyonce, CAN, David Arnold, Michael Price, Troy Miller, Sacha Skarbek, Ash Howes, Seton Daunt, Erland Cooper, Ivory Layne, Gold Spectacles, Lenny Fontana, Rob Wheeler, Kathy Brown, Maya Delilah, Max Jaeger, LIFE, Brooke Bentham, ZAND, and many more.

They are involved in master recordings and producing music, which includes a production music library (Standard Music Library) and record labels including: Cube Records and its offshoots, Cube Soundtracks, Fly Records, and Qnote Records.

== Other companies incorporated in Bucks Music Group ==
=== BDi Music ===
Established in 2004, BDi has established itself as a Grammy award winning independent music publishing business representing songwriters, composers and TV production companies with deals tailor-made for individual creative talent. They develop and nurture songwriters across a range of disciplines and genres, negotiating tirelessly on their behalf as well as searching for the best commercial opportunities for their catalogues. BDi's catalogue includes 35 co-written songs with Ed Sheeran and many more hit songs across the global charts.

=== Cube Soundtracks ===
Cube Soundtracks was established in 2002 by Bucks Music Group Ltd.

The record label primarily releases distinguished music albums associated with independent British films, or created by outstanding British Composer / Artists. Especially, though not necessarily, music by composers published by Bucks Music Group Ltd, and also their affiliate BDI Music's composers.

=== Fly Records ===
Fly Records was a British independent record label, established in 1970 by the independent music publisher David Platz, and initially managed by Malcolm Jones from the offices of Essex Music in London.

Platz had been producing records independently, in conjunction with record producers funded by Essex, and leasing them to major record labels. These creative collaborations quickly made their mark with hits such as "A Whiter Shade Of Pale" (Procol Harum), "Flowers In The Rain", "I Can Hear The Grass Grow" and "Blackberry Way" (The Move), together with work from Beverley Kutner, Tucker Zimmerman and Michael Chapman.

The producer roster involved with Platz included Denny Cordell, Gus Dudgeon, Rodger Bain, Don Paul, Johnny Worth and Tony Visconti, whom Platz had brought over to the UK at Cordell's initiation. After a string of hits in the late 1960s licensed via labels Deram and, later, Regal Zonophone, Platz launched his own label Fly Records in 1970. Malcolm Jones had left university to work for EMI, becoming a label manager and creating his own imprint at EMI, Harvest Records, but moved to work for Platz as manager of Fly.

Fly's first release was "Ride A White Swan" by T.Rex, produced by Visconti. The following year the album Electric Warrior was both Fly's and Bolan's first #1 album.

In keeping with Platz's publishing style, the label chose not to concentrate on a particular sector of the market but preferred to offer an eclectic mix of artists and releases, some aimed directly at the chart and some intended simply to enhance the profiles of new artists or artists who were linked to the Platz's publishing enterprise. Vivian Stanshall, Third World War, John Kongos, Georgia Brown, John Keating, Richard Henry and John Williams were all featured on the label's early releases.

In 1972, Fly consolidated their chart success with older material. Three-track Magni-Fly singles re-introduced songs from the company's back catalogue, such as "A Whiter Shade Of Pale", into the UK Singles Chart. An album campaign entitled 'Toofas', (double albums priced as a single), found favour, and albums such as Procol Harum's debut set suddenly made the UK Albums Chart years after their initial release. Once T.Rex's Bolan Boogie reached No. 1 in the UK Albums Chart, departures at Fly HQ forced a change of plan. Jones left the label, Cordell moved to the United States forming Shelter Records, and Bolan moved to EMI, where he was given his own imprint, taking Visconti with him. The new Fly team chose to re-launch the label as Cube Records, with a new logo caging the 'Fly' in a cubic goal. A raft of new artists were signed, and Fly Records was shelved as a label in its own right.

By 1990, Essex Music's original partners had split, and Platz incorporated the Fly label into his company, Onward Music Ltd, whilst Platz's publishing company Bucks Music Ltdremained his core business. From time to time, Fly Records was resuscitated as an independent outlet for various publishing related projects, whilst Onward's back catalogue was licensed to catalogue companies under the Cube Records name. Since the new millennium, Onward's ongoing archive exploration has revealed a host of original tapes thought lost, as well as unreleased and forgotten recordings from unfinished or unreleased projects from the production company, which is being channelled through Fly Records.

== Catalogue includes works from ==
- The Rolling Stones
- David Bowie
- Marc Bolan
- T-Rex
- Nigel Hess
- DJ Fresh
- Richard G. Mitchell
- Matthew Herbert
- David Arnold
- The Move
- Black Sabbath
- Procol Harum
- Run The Jewels
- Rudimental
- CAN
- Troy Miller
- Sacha Skarbek
- Ash Howes
- Seton Daunt
- Erland Cooper
- Ivory Layne
- Gold Spectacles
- Kathy Brown
- Maya Delilah
- Max Jaeger
- LIFE
- Brooke Bentham
- ZAND
- Lenny Fontana
- Rob Wheeler
