= Zand =

Zand may refer to:

- Zend, a class of exegetical commentaries on Zoroastrian scripture
- Zand District, an administrative subdivision of Iran
- Zand Boulevard, in Shiraz, Iran
- Z And, a variable star
- Zand (musician), stage name of English musician Zander Sweeney
- Who founded the dynasty of zand/who was the lotf ali khan zand

== As a tribal/clan and dynastic name ==
- Zand tribe, a former Lak tribe of western Iran, a member of which founded the Zand dynasty
- Zand dynasty (1751–1794), a dynasty that ruled southern and central Iran
- Karim Khan Zand (r. 1751–1779), founder of the Zand dynasty

== As a surname ==
- Zand (surname)
- Shlomo Zand (born 1946), more commonly spelled Shlomo Sand, Israeli academic
- Lazlo Zand, fictional character from Robotech
