= Sande (surname) =

Sande or Sandé is a surname, and may refer to:

- Álvaro de Sande (1489–1573), Spanish nobleman and military leader
- Antonio Sande (born 1909), Argentine sprinter
- Arne Sande (1905–1985), Danish boxer
- Bernard Sande, Malawian civil servant and diplomat
- Chris Sande (born 1964), Kenyan boxer
- Daniel Sande (born 1916), Argentine fencer
- Earl Sande (1898–1968), American jockey and horse trainer
- Emeli Sandé (born 1987), British singer
- Erling Sande (born 1978), Norwegian politician
- Francisco de Sande (1540–1602), Spanish governor and captain-general
- Hans Sande (born 1946), Norwegian psychiatrist and writer
- Jakob Sande (1906–1967), Norwegian writer, poet and folk singer
- Kermit A. Sande (born 1943), American politician from South Dakota
- Leif Sande (born 1953), Norwegian politician
- Mads Sande (born 1998), Norwegian footballer
- Merle Sande (1939–2007), American infectiologist
- Siri Sande (born 1943), Norwegian archaeologist and professor
- Walter Sande (1906–1972), American actor

== See also ==
- Sand (surname)
- van de Sande
