= Lilla Hansen =

Norwegian architect (1872–1962)

Lilla Georgine Hansen
- Born: Georgine Marie Hansen; April 1, 1872; Oslo, Norway
- Died: June 11, 1962 (aged 90); Oslo, Norway
- Known for: Architecture

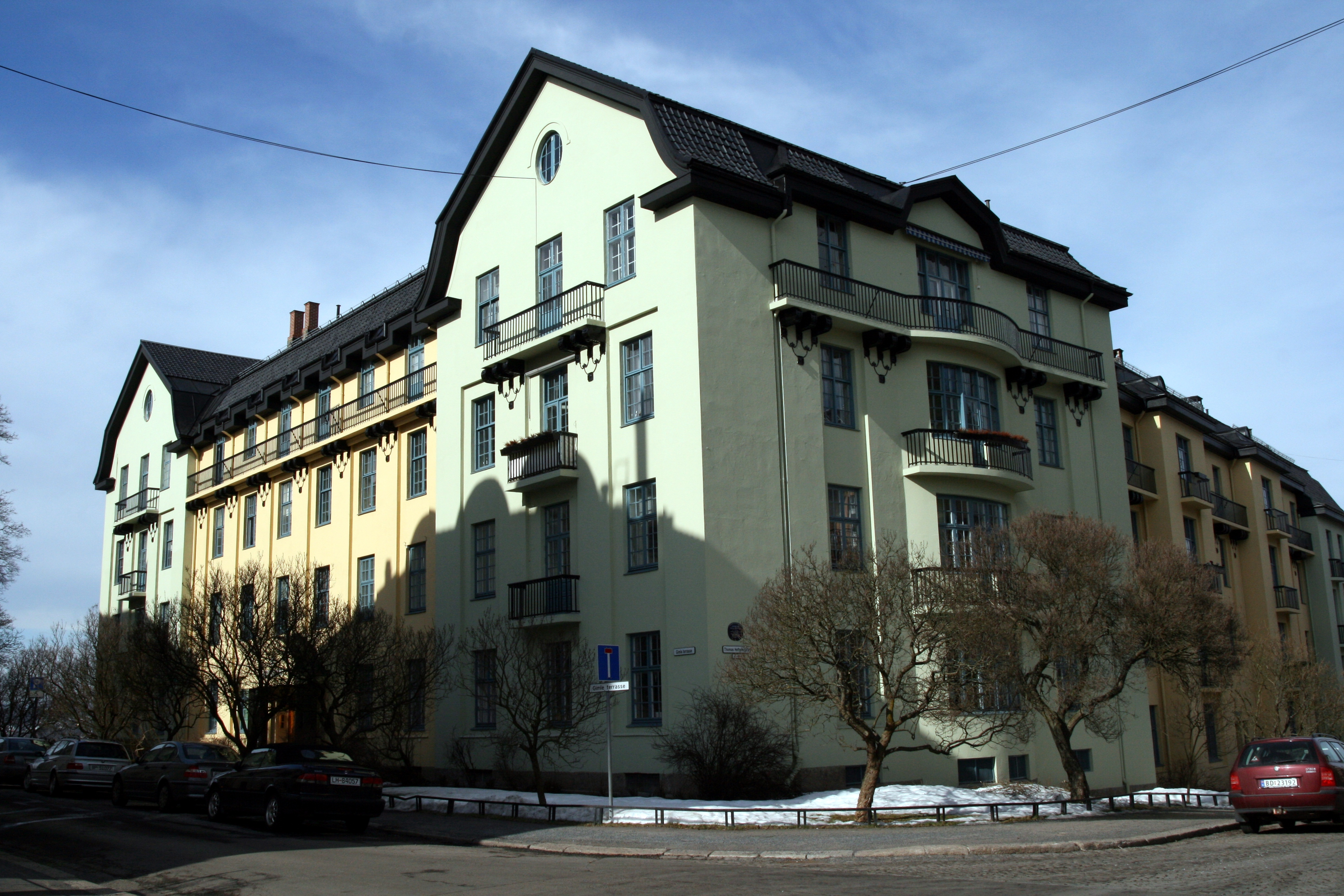
Heftyeterrassen - Thomas Heftyes gate 42-44 in Oslo (1911-13)

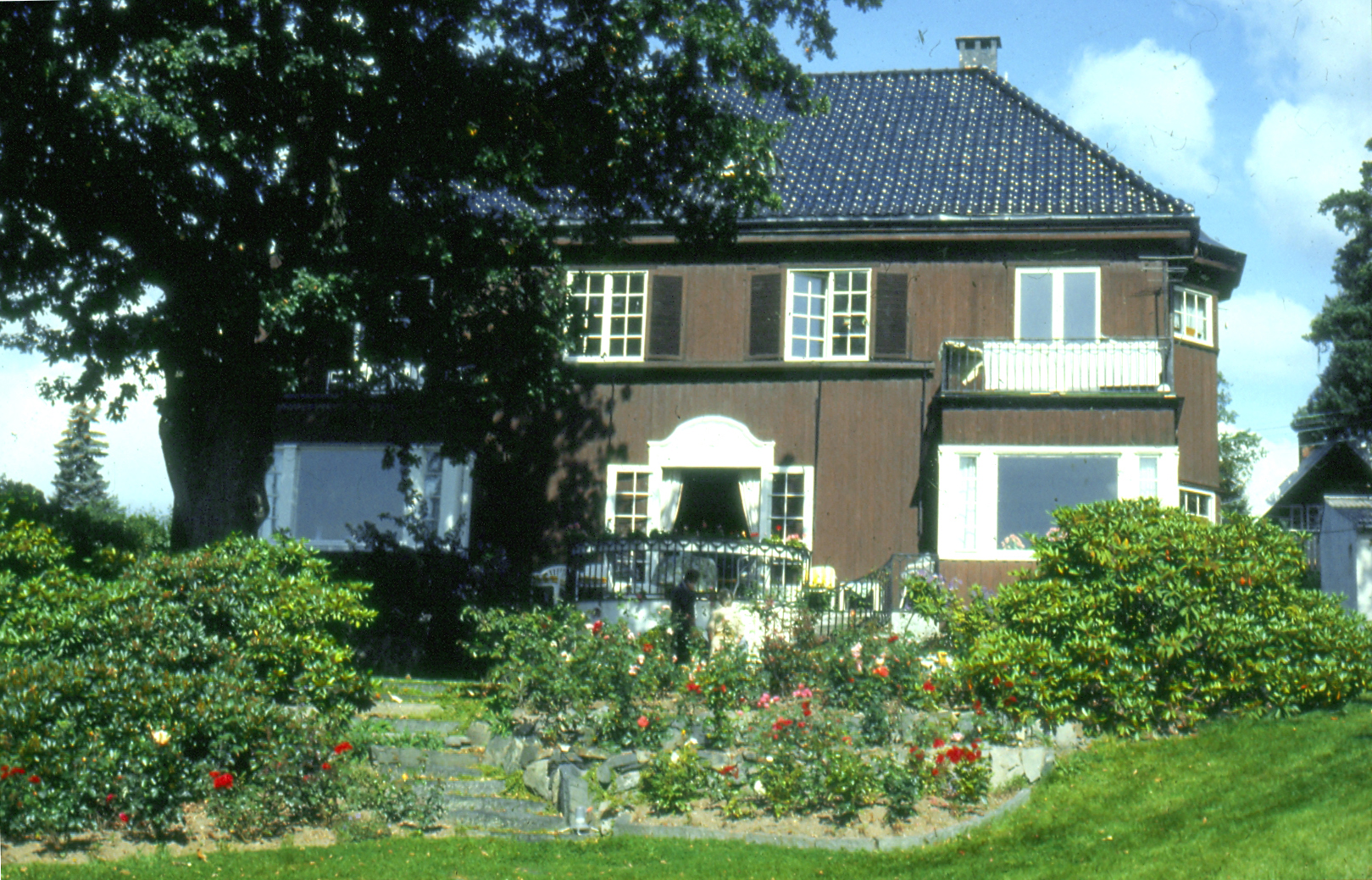
Trosterudveien 10 in Aker (now Oslo) (1912)

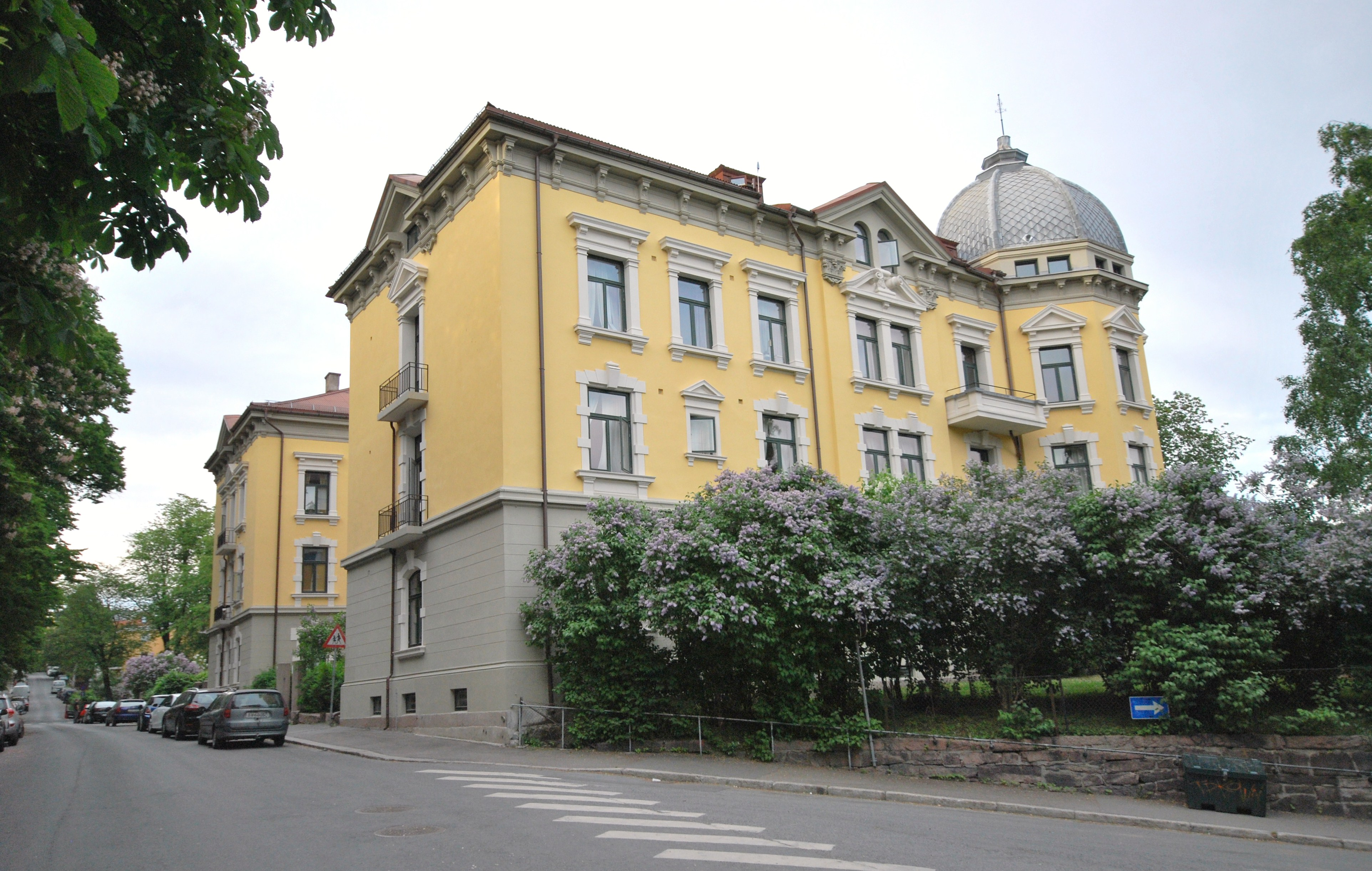
Studiehjemmet for unge piker (1916)

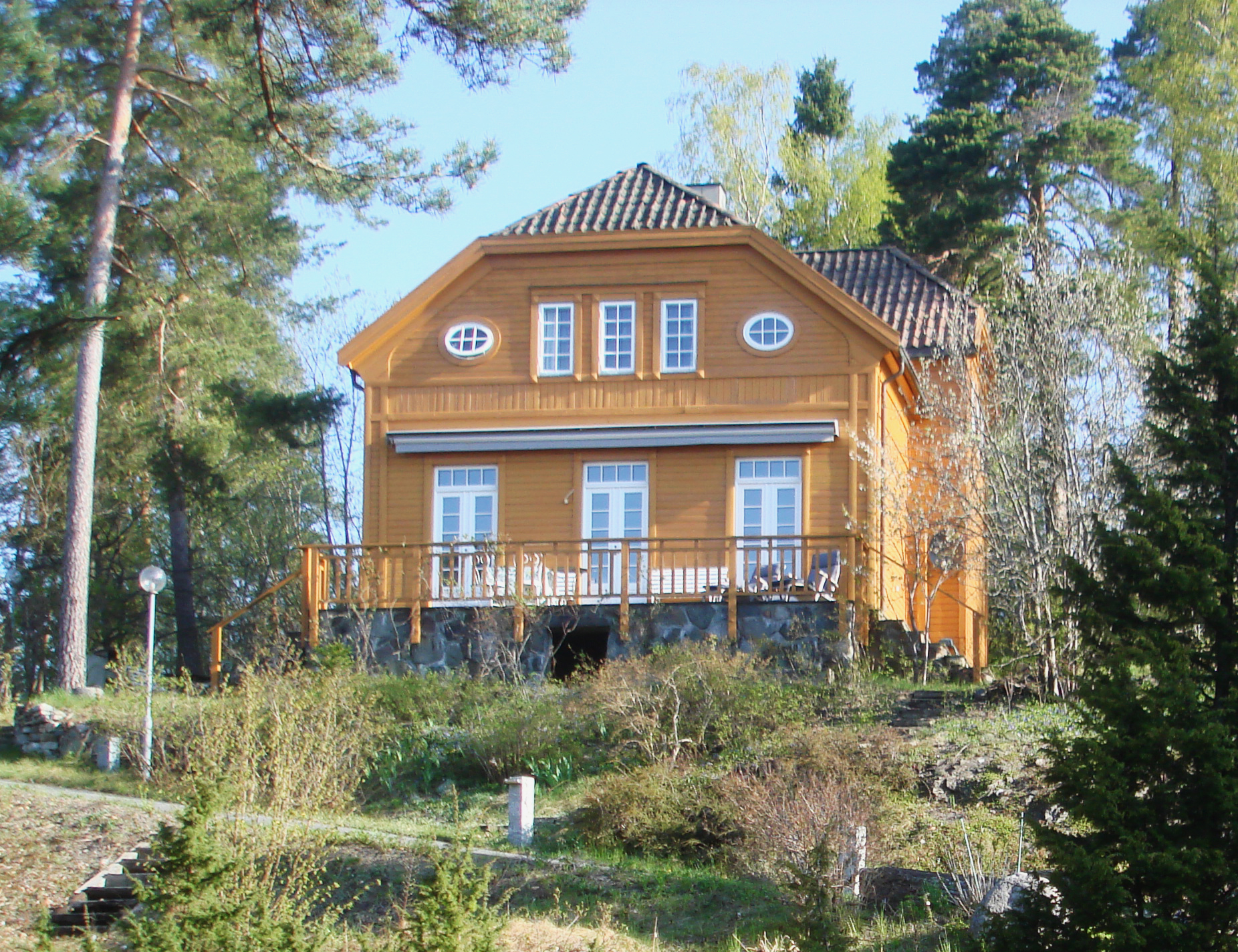
Summer house for Aimée and Theodor Frølich on Nesøya in Asker (1903)

Lilla Georgine Hansen (1 April 1872 – 11 June 1962) was Norway's first female architect.

== Background ==
Georgine Marie Hansen was born in Christiania (now Oslo), Norway. She was the daughter of Georg Martin Hansen (1828–1915) and Maren Paulowna Victoria Bülow (1838–1898). She studied at the Royal Drafting School (now Oslo National Academy of the Arts) under Herman Major Schirmer, graduating in 1894. She completed her architectural education in Brussels where she trained with Victor Horta. She also served architectural apprenticeships with architects Halfdan Berle Oslo and Martin Nyrop in Copenhagen. She established her own practice in 1912. After her breakthrough the same year with Heftyeterrassen, a residential complex at Thomas Heftyes gate 42 in Oslo, she went on to design a number of large villas as well as a hospital and student accommodation for women.

== Career ==
Her first known works was a cabin at Frønsvollenin Nordmarka, listed in 1902 for tobacco manufacturer Nicolai Andresen. Her next work was the summer house of professor Theodor Frølich at Nesøya in Asker from 1903. Both these early houses she drew before she established a private office. At Asker in 1910, she drew the main building at Hval farm for estate owner Wilhelm Roede. In 1912 she designed a villa at Trosterudveien 10 in Aker in Norwegian national romanticism for Lil and Nils Roede. Roughly contemporary were villas at Nobels gate 10 and Fritzners gate 4 in Oslo.

The breakthrough came with the first prize in the architectural competition in 1912 for the complex Heftyeterrassen in Oslo in Neo-baroque. Gyldenløves gate 19 from 1929 is a monumental structure designed in Neoclassical architecture on Arno Bergs plass in Frogner. She was also responsible for the decor of the building which housed the Studiehjem for unge pike. Founded in 1916 by Kristine Bonnevie, Studiehjem offers homes for female students over the age of 18. Located near St. Hanshaugen Park, it was a short distance to public transport and walking distance to several campuses. In 2004 Karina Hyggen Amland prevented demolition. Acting with the Support Association for the Conservation of Hoffsjef Løvenskiolds Road 4, the villa was added to the Norwegian Directorate for Cultural Heritage's list of properties with cultural heritage.

== Selected works ==
- Maristuen at Frønsvollen in Nordmarka for Nicolai Andresen (1902)
- Vacation home on Nesøya in Asker for Theodor Frølich (1903)
- Hval farm house in Aker for Wilhelm Roede (1910)
- Trosterudveien 10 in Oslo for Lil and Nils Roede (1912)
- Villa Nobel Street 10 in Oslo (ca. 1912)
- Villa, Fritzner Street 4 in Oslo (ca. 1912)
- Leiegård at Gyldenløve gate 19 in Frogner (1929)

== See also ==
- Women in architecture
- Maja Melandsø, early Norwegian female architect
- Hjørdis Grøntoft Raknerud, early Norwegian female architect
