= Hjørdis Grøntoft Raknerud =

Norwegian architect

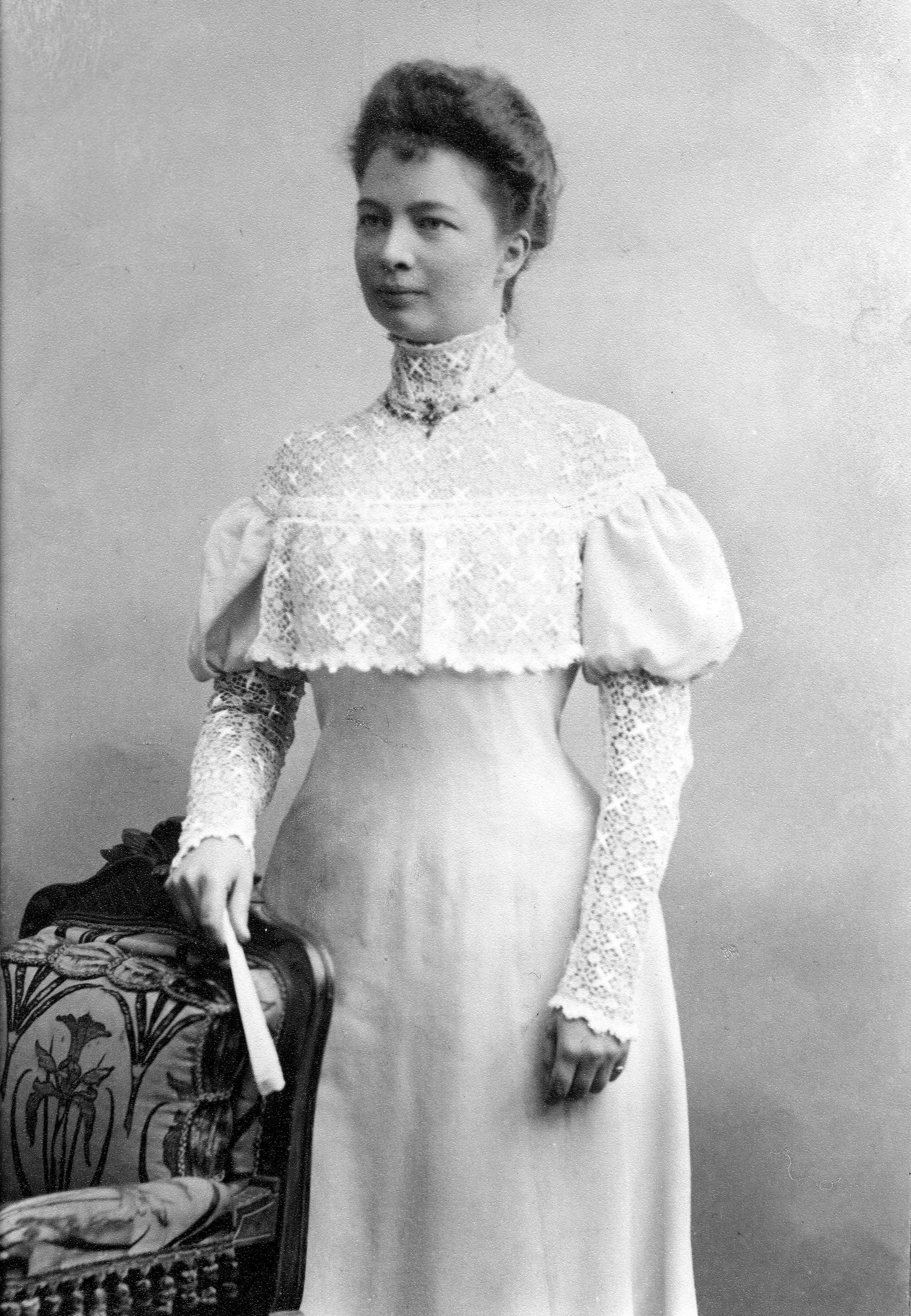
- Hjørdis Grøntoft (1890s)
- Born: Hjørdis Grøntoft; 11 July 1878; Kristiania, Norway
- Died: 13 October 1918 (aged 40); Drammen, Norway
- Education: Christiania Kunst- og Haandværksskole; Royal Academy of Arts
- Occupation: Architect
- Spouse: Nils Raknerud
- Buildings: Sandsgården, Gjøvik

Hjørdis Grøntoft Raknerud (née Grøntoft, 11 July 1878 – 13 October 1918) was a Norwegian architect. She was one of Scandinavia's earliest female architects, practising in Norway and Sweden from 1898.

== Biography ==
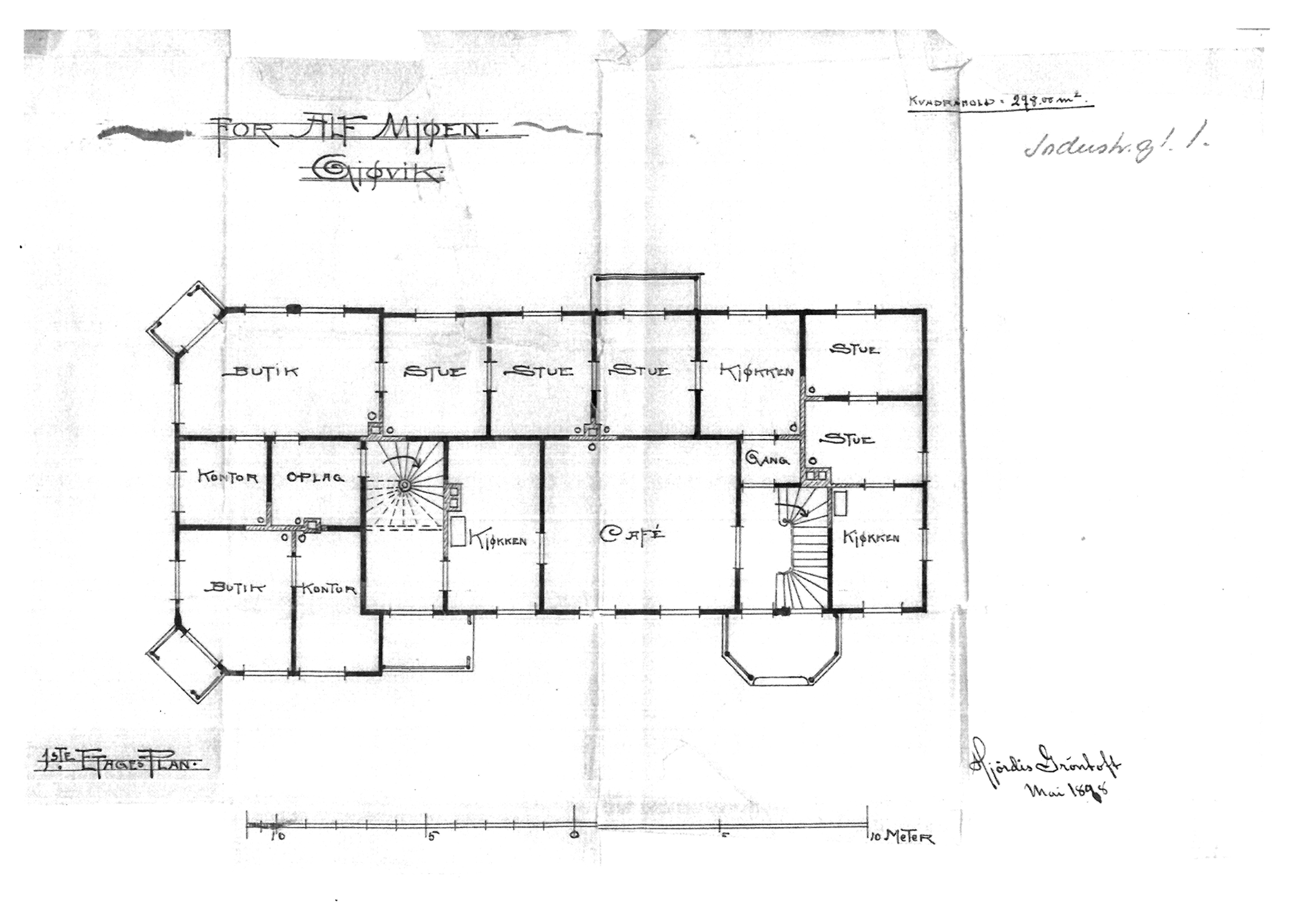
Signed floor plan for Sandsgården, Gjøvik (1898)

Raknerud was raised in Kristiania (today's Oslo) where her father Hagbarth August Grøntoft (1847–1884) was a merchant. She spent three years at the Christiania Kunst- og Haandværksskole, receiving training in architecture (1895–1897). After completing her studies, she trained with Ove Ekman and Holger Sinding-Larsen. In 1898, she designed Sandsgården, a large house in Gjøvik complete with shops and offices. Her signed plans dated May 1898 are in the municipal archives. Heidi Froknestad, who has researched Grøntoft Raknerud's background, points out how unusual it was for a woman to design a commercial building at the end of the 19th century.

In 1898, she continued her studies at the Royal Academy of Arts in London where she was one of the earliest female students. In a letter, she wrote: "I am in any case the first woman in this class..."

When she returned from London, there were few opportunities for architects in Norway. In 1904, she moved to Malmø, Sweden, where she worked for the city architect. She also designed interiors and furniture. Several of the buildings she designed can be seen in Malmø and Lund. After Malmø, she went to Paris to continue her studies. It was there she met Nils Raknerud, whom she married in 1908.

The couple settled in Drammen in the south of Norway where she continued to design residential buildings and furniture. In 1918, after catching the Spanish flu, she died of pneumonia on 13 October.

== See also ==
- Lilla Hansen, Norway's first female architect
- Maja Melandsø, early Norwegian female architect
- Women in architecture
