= Florin Sandu (lawyer) =

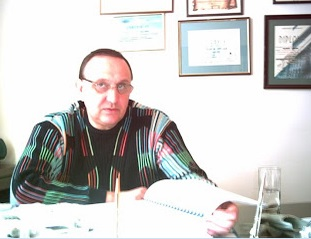
- Born: February 24, 1949 (age 77); Balinț, Timiș County, Romanian People's Republic
- Education: University of Bucharest
- Occupation: Lawyer

Florin Sandu (Romanian pronunciation: flo'rin san'du, born February 24, 1949) is a former judoka and a former chief of the Romanian Police. He is a Quaestor who served as inspector general of Romanian Police and then as Secretary of State, the First Deputy of the Minister in Ministry of Interior from Romania. Sandu is currently a professor at Romanian-American University and a lawyer.

== Early life ==
Sandu was born on February 24, 1949, in Balinț, Timiș County, Romania. His father Zamfir worked in the Interior Ministry. His mother Berta was a nurse. His brother Ion Eugen Sandu was Brigadier General in the Ministry of Interior, Chief of the Romanian Police from 1993 to 1995, and the Secretary of State at the Ministry of Interior. In 1995 he died in a tragic helicopter accident on September 1, 1995.

Sandu attended elementary school at School No. 157 and then continued his studies at Tudor Vladimirescu Theoretical High School in Bucharest. After graduating high school, he enrolled at the Alexandru Ioan Cuza School of Police Officers in Bucharest, from which he graduated in 1969. He then worked as a police officer in the economic department and was appointed Chief.

He competed in judo at the Rapid Club of Bucharest from 1968 to 1972 and ranked second in the national championship as a heavyweight and played on national teams. Subsequently, he was appointed Honorary President of the Romanian Association of Kendo.

In 1972, he graduated from the Faculty of Law from the University of Bucharest.

== Career ==
Sandu was appointed to positions in the Police Inspectorates from Caraș-Severin County, Brăila, and Bucharest. In 1997 he obtained a doctorate in law.

In 2001 he became General Inspector of the General Inspectorate of Romanian Police a post he held it until November 2003.

From November 2003 to December 2005 he was Secretary of State, the First Deputy of the Minister in Ministry of Interior.

=== Romanian police chief ===
From January 2001 to November 2003 Colonel Sandu served as General Inspector of Romanian Police. Following this appointment, he was promoted to brigadier general, which later turned in the function of Quaestor.

Sandu led the General Inspectorate of Police, pursuing corruption and fraud investigations against some businessmen.

He requested the extradition of former President Bankcoop Alexander Dinulescu.

Sandu said legislative changes were needed to combat corruption.

He was named Honorary President of the International Police Association (IPA).

He served as Inspector General of Romanian Police for almost three years, following his post as Chief. From November 2003 through December 2005 he was also Secretary of State and First Deputy of the Minister in the Ministry of Interior.

He retired from government on 31 December 2005.

=== Academic/attorney ===
In parallel with the activity in Ministry of Interior, he worked as a professor since 1998 in Criminology and Business Law at the Faculty of Law from the Romanian-American University in Bucharest.

In 2000 he became an Associate Professor and in 2003 became a professor at the Romanian-American University.

He is Associate Professor and leadership Ph.D. at Alexandru Ioan Cuza Police Academy.

In 2006 he became a lawyer in Bucharest. He was the subject of media scandal for representing defendants from the underworld.

In 1972 Sandu participated in the production of Lex Cause in Private International Law, at the University of Bucharest, Faculty of Law. In 1976 he taught a postgraduate course: Mediator Situation Reflected in art. 37, paragraph 1 and 3 of Decree 210/1960. In 1978 he taught the course: The manager's role in researching on the site in special situations at Military School for the Training of Militia Officers.

Since 1993 Sandu has participated in over 35 international symposia in multiple countries, on police work, economic and financial crimes, organized crime, money laundering, car theft, etc.

He was the coordinator in developing the course: Organizational Management in Public Order.

As of 2011, Sandu was a member of the scientific board of the Journal of Criminal Investigation.

He presented the opening address in "Policing Minorities" at the Regional Conference on Policing Minorities, Human Rights and Conflict Management for Roma Liaison Police Officers in 7–8 May 2004.

He published a course on public order for Three Publishing 1999, Bucharest.

== Papers ==
- Smuggling-component of organized crime, 1997- National Publishing House, Bucharest.
- Fraud in the banking and capital market, 1998-Three Publishing House, Bucharest.
- Smuggling and the money whitening, 1998-Three Publishing House, Bucharest.
- Criminology, 2000, reprinted in 2001 Sylvi Publishing House, Bucharest.
- Criminal Law Affairs, 2002, reprinted in 3003 Sylvi Publishing House, Bucharest.
- Stop Drugs, 2002-Sylvi Publishing House, Bucharest.
- Course of theory and tactics Police, 2002-Publishing MI, Bucharest.
- Environmental Law, 2002-Sylvi Publishing House, Bucharest.
- Criminology, 2004-Sylvi Publishing House, Bucharest.
- Theoretical and Applied Criminology, 2005-Legal Publishing House, Bucharest.
