= Diabugu =

- Nicknames: Diabanna, Diafara, Diadolay
- Location in the Gambia
- Coordinates: 13°23′N 14°24′W
- Country: The Gambia
- Division: Upper River Division
- District: Sandu

Government
  - Alikalo: Alhaji Kursa Drammeh

Population (2016)
  - Total: 9,000 (est.)
  - Ethnicities: Sarahule
  - Religions: Islam

Diabugu is a village in eastern Gambia. It is the biggest village in Sandu District in the Upper River Division.

== History ==
It was founded by Foday Sillah about 1650. Foday Sillah's grandson established the nearby village of Jagejari. His son in turn, Ba Sillah, was the last Alkalo (village head) of Diabugu from the family. He established a new settlement called Diabugu Ba Sillah south of the Gambia River, leaving the village to his first cousin and brother-in-law Mahamadou Mankoro Drammeh Sama, whose family inherited the position.

Diabugu is a prominent Sarahuleh village, the oldest in the area and the only one in the former Kingdom of Wuli that predates the 19th century invasion by Mamadu Lamine Drammeh.

An elementary school was established in the early 1940s, follow by a clinic and veterinary station. In 1961, the government built a primary school to cater for the growing need of western education. In 2016, Diabugu had an estimated population of 9,000. It also has a high school.

== Ruling Families ==
Under the leadership of Mankoro Drammeh Sama's eldest son Madala Drammeh Sama, the Drammeh Kanji and Drammeh Sama clans were united. Inheritance of the Alkaloship is now based on seniority.

The Drammeh Sama and Drammeh Kanji descend from the same mother, Jalia Sillah, but from different fathers making them nephews of Foday Sillah and his family. There are still Sillahs in Diabugu Batapa but those sillahs are luntangs, or guests. The Sillahs that are related to Drammeh are the Sillah Manganera, the heads of Jagajari, Madina Samako and Diabugu Ba Sillah. The first Drammeh Kanji to become Alkalo of Diabugu was Batapa Drammeh, a large and brave man who gave the village his name due to his renown.

The Drammeh Korimas and Drammeh wakanehs cannot be Alkalolu but they can handle the post of Head of Serna if they are the eldest in the family provided they are also a parent, the clan which the Sillahs and Drammehs belong. There are other surnames in the clan but leadership of the clan is limited to Sillah, Drammeh Sama, drammeh Wakaneh, Drammeh Korima and Drammeh Kanji. This is why the present head of the Serna Clan is Saikou Sillah who is the nephew of Kibili Kaka Drammeh. Kibili Kaka is also the son of Madala Drammeh. Madala Drammeh's wife Kaka Drammeh and Batapa Drammeh's wife Gata Drammeh are sisters. This is why Yugu Kasseh Gata Drammeh (son of Batapa) and Kibili Kaka Drammeh (son of Madala) are cousins since their mothers shared the same mother and father from Kanji-Kunda-Tabokoto.

== Village Leadership ==
According to local sources, the following served as Headmen of Diabugu. The list is not exhaustive and based on narrations.

1. Foday "Baba" Sillah- Founding Father
2. Kissima Sillah, he later left to established his own settlement, East-south of Basse called Sabu-Sireh
3. Abdou Sillah
4. Ba Sillah
5. Ebrima Drammeh
6. Kekero Jalia Drammeh sometimes called Makoro Drammeh
7. Batapa Drammeh
8. Madala Drammeh
9. Kibili Kaka Drammeh
10. Kibili Henda Drammeh
11. Sorrie Juma Drammeh
12. Ka- Hammeh Drammeh
13. Ka Tamba Drammeh
14. Madala Tuguneh Drammeh
15. Alhagie Yugu kasseh Drammeh
16. Alhagie Kissima Sorie Drammeh
17. Mansa Drammeh
18. Alhajie Kursa Drammeh
19. Alhagie Jadou Kah Drammeh
20. Alh Morro Simbo Drammeh Present Alkalo (son of Yugu Kasseh Drammeh and grandson of Batapa Drammeh)

This list above is not ordered chronologically, except from Alhagie Kissima Sorrie Drammeh to the present.

The following Diabugu natives also served as District Chief for Sandu:

- Batapa Drammeh (1925-41)
- Yogou Kaseh Drammeh (1941/2-1972)
- Alhajie Seikou Baye Drammeh (1973-90)
- Ansumana Mansa Drammeh (2000-03)
