= Kirsten Sand =

Norwegian architect (1895–1996)

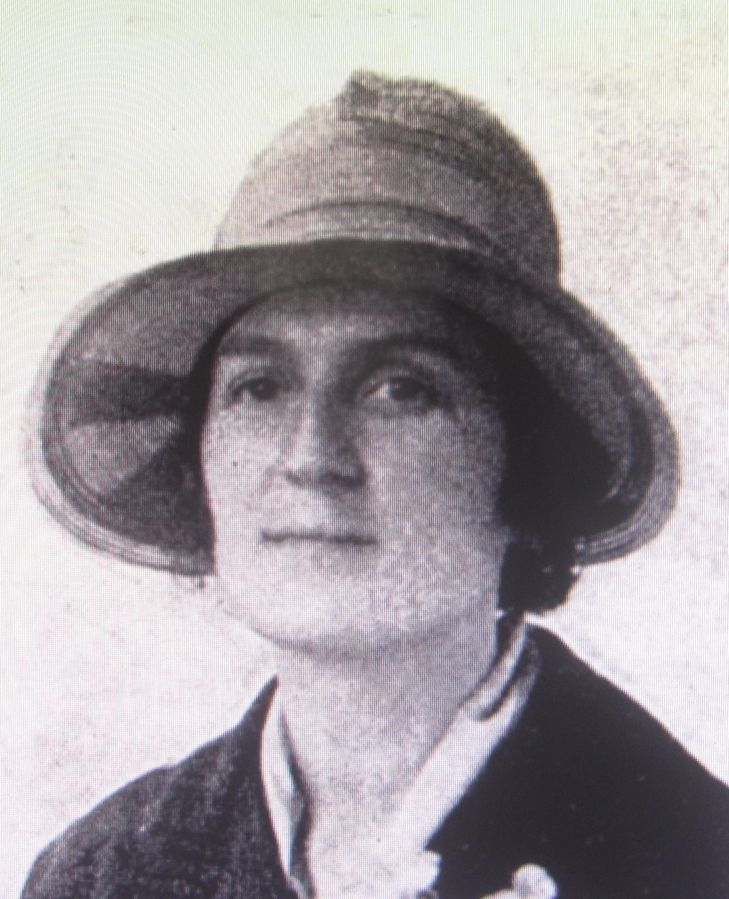
Kirsten Sand (photographed ca. 1919)

Kirsten Eleonore Helena Sand (27 November 1895 – 12 May 1996) was a Norwegian architect. In 1919, she became the first woman to graduate with full technical competence in architecture from the Norwegian Institute of Technology (NTH). Until the Second World War, she ran her own practice in Oslo where she designed private homes. After the war, she contributed to reconstruction projects, especially in Troms County in northern Norway.

== Biography ==
Born in Kristiania (now Oslo), Sand was the daughter of the lawyer August Nicolai Sand (1852–1940) and his wife Constance, née Hirsch, a schoolteacher. After matriculating from high school, she was admitted to the Norwegian Institute of Technology in 1915 where she was the first woman to receive a full architecture diploma in 1919.

After working on military projects for several months, she joined August Nielsen's firm in Oslo. In 1928, she opened her own office which she ran until 1940, designing private homes, apartment buildings and summer houses for Oslo and the surroundings. They were usually in the Functionalist style. In the post-war period, Sand was one of the main contributors to the reconstruction of properties destroyed in the northern area of Troms where she was based from 1952 to 1966.

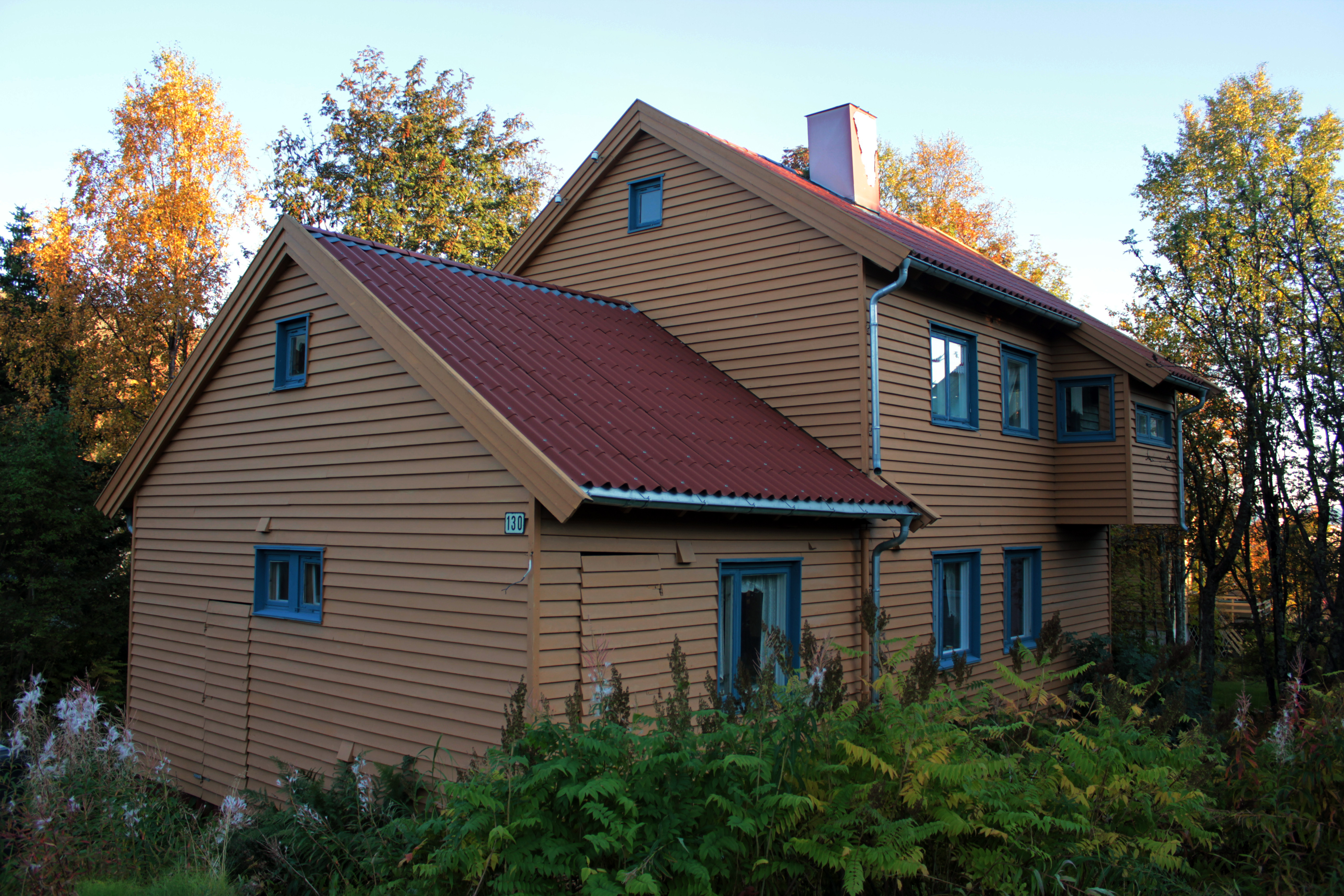
Sand's home on Mellomveien in Tromsø

While in Troms during 1952, she designed an experimental house for herself at Mellomveien 130 in Tromsø. The Kirsten Sand house (Kirsten Sand huset) is situated on the southeast side of Tromsø, approximately 2.5 km south of the city centre. Typically for Sand, the layout is centred on a large kitchen which forms part of the open living-room area. It is closely connected to a laundry room and pantry with outdoor firewood storage within easy reach. It was therefore unnecessary for the house to have a cellar and could thus be built at a reasonable cost. It was also particularly suited to the needs of a housewife or female occupant.

It was built as a demonstration of a light wooden platform construction. It was imperative during the reconstruction effort in the aftermath of World War II to use as few and light materials as possible. Once completed the house was open to the general public several Sundays on a row. It is a relatively small and simple house with two floors and an attic. At the northern end is a one story extension containing storage rooms. Brown corrugated fibre cement sheeting covers the two roofs and the wooden cladding is ochre with blue window surrounds and frames. To the east the house has a smaller extension with large windows and exit to the garden as well as two other characteristic bay windows. Kirsten Sand lived in the house until 1994. In 2017 this house was declared a protected landmark by the Tromsø municipality.

== Later life ==
In 1965, Sand was honoured with the King's Medal of Merit (gold). On the occasion of her hundredth birthday, she became an honorary member of the Norske arkitekters landsforbund, the national association for architects in Norway, "for her strong commitment to housing design and her huge contribution to reconstruction work in northern Norway".

Kirsten Sand died in Tromsø. She is buried in a family grave in Cemetery of Our Saviour in Oslo.

== See also ==
- Maja Melandsø – one of the other first Norwegian women to receive an architecture degree
