= SANDU v Minister of Defence =

SANDU v Minister of Defence may refer to either of two judgments by the Constitutional Court of South Africa:

- SANDU v Minister of Defence (1999)
- SANDU v Minister of Defence (2007)

== See also ==
- South African labour law
