= DigitaltMuseum =

Norwegian and Swedish database

DigitaltMuseum (lit. 'The Digital Museum') is a website database in Norwegian and Swedish for art, images and cultural history museums.

The service was established in 2009 after a trial period. The database is developed and operated by KulturIT. KulturIT ANS was established by the Norwegian Museum of Cultural History and Maihaugen in consultation with the Norwegian Archive, Library and Museum Authority (ABM) in 2007. In 2015, the company underwent a corporate transformation and KulturIT AS was established on 12 February.

The website has per 2025 around 2,548,022 images. Many of the images are in the public domain or under Creative Commons licenses and are being imported into Wikimedia Commons.

The website's API was developed in 2012.

== Institutions ==
As of 2025, there are 223 collaborating museums.

== Mission ==
DigitaltMuseum aims to make the museums' collections accessible to all interested parties, regardless of time and place. The website aims to facilitate easy use of the collections through various methods including image searches, research, teaching and joint knowledge development.

DigitaltMuseum contains collections from several hundred Norwegian and Swedish museums, totalling around five million objects. The website contains both historical images from the areas and themes covered by the museums, as well as images of artefacts from the collections. Parts of the collection have previously only been shown in the museums' exhibitions and books and have therefore rarely or never been shown to the public.
