= Sandu District =

District of Upper River Division of The Gambia

Coordinates: 13°25′N 14°22′W

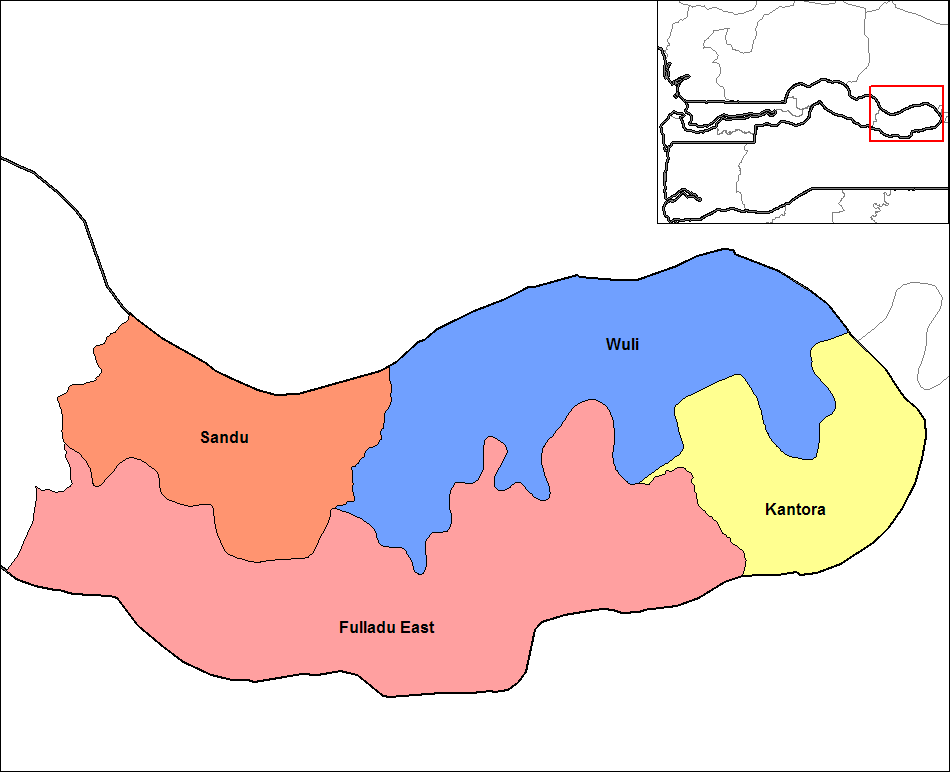
Districts of Upper River Division

Sandu District sometimes spell as Sandou or Sandugu is one of the districts of the Upper River Division of the Republic of the Gambia. It contains the town of Diabugu.

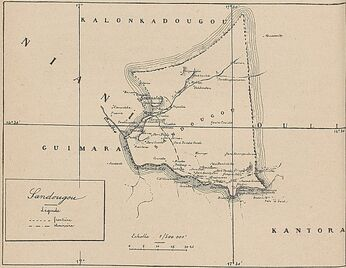
Map of the kingdom of Sandougou in the 1890s
