= Sandi (surname) =

Sandi is a surname. Notable people with the surname include:

- Antonio Sandi (1733–1817), Italian engraver
- Federico Sandi (born 1989), Italian motorcycle racer
- Hendra Sandi (born 1995), Indonesian footballer
- Luis Sandi (1905–1996), Mexican musician, teacher, and composer
