= Corina Sandu =

Romanian-American mechanical engineer

Corina Sandu is a Romanian-American mechanical engineer, the Robert E. Hord Jr. Professor of Mechanical Engineering at Virginia Tech. Her research topics include multibody systems, vehicle dynamics, and terramechanics, the interactions between soil properties and vehicle dynamics.

== Education and career ==
Sandu earned a diploma in mechanics from the Politehnica University of Bucharest in 1991. She went to the University of Iowa for graduate study in mechanical engineering, earning a master's degree in 1995 and completing her Ph.D. in 2000.

She joined the Virginia Tech faculty in 2003, and was named Robert E. Hord Jr. Professor in 2020.

As of 2022, she is president of the International Society for Terrain Vehicle Systems, and editor-in-chief of the journals Mechanics Based Design of Structures and Machines and SAE International Journal of Commercial Vehicles.

== Recognition ==
Sandu was named an ASME Fellow in 2012, and a Fellow of SAE International in 2017.

In 2013, SAE International gave Sandu two of their awards, the Rodica Baranescu Award for Technical & Leadership Excellence in Commercial Vehicle Engineering and the Forest R. McFarland Award for outstanding contributions to engineering meetings.
