= Sandy (surname) =

Sandy is the surname of:

- Casey Sandy (born 1984), Canadian gymnast
- Gary Sandy (born 1945), American actor best known for playing Andy Travis on the sitcom W.K.R.P. in Cincinnati
- Grace Linn Sandy (1874-1940), American composer
- Frederick George Sandy, Canadian politician
- Isabelle Sandy (1884–1975), French poet and writer
- Jamie Sandy (born 1963), Australian rugby league footballer who played in the 1980s
- Kurnia Sandy (born 1975), Indonesian retired football goalkeeper
- Mark Sandy, US government official
- Marco Sandy (born 1971), Brazilian former footballer
- Michael Sandy (1977–2006), African-American targeted for robbery because he was gay; fatally struck by a car while attempting to escape
- Titus Sandy Jr (born 2002), Dominica footballer

== See also ==
- Sandys (surname)
