= Zand (surname) =

Zand is a surname, and may refer to:

- Ali Zand (born 1999), Iranian karateka
- Banafsheh Zand-Bonazzi (born 1961), Iranian writer, film producer and activist
- Ben Zand (born 1991), British filmmaker
- Ebrahim Zand (1888–1974), Iranian politician
- Karim Zand (1924–2017), Kurdish historian and geographer
- Kayvon Zand, American performer and musician
- Khosrow Shakeri Zand (1938–2015), Iranian historian, translator and activist
- Nathalie Zand (1883–1942), Polish neurologist
- Nosson Zand (born 1981), American rapper
- Sahar Zand (born 1989), British Iranian journalist
- Shiloh 't Zand (born 2003), Dutch footballer
- Stephen Joseph Zand (1898–1963), American aeronautical pioneer

== See also ==
- Zand dynasty in Iran
- Sand (surname)
