= Romanian-American University =

Private university in Bucharest, Romania

Coordinates: 44°28′25.80″N 26°3′54.75″E

- Type: Private
- Established: 17 April 1991
- Founders: Ion Smedescu
- Rector: Costel Negricea
- Location: 1B Expoziției Blvd., Bucharest
- Website: www.rau.ro

The Romanian-American University (Romanian: Universitatea Româno-Americană) is a private university in Bucharest, Romania, which offers courses and degrees in English as well as Romanian, emphasizing international business. It was founded by Ion Smedescu.

The Romanian-American University is a higher education institution, a legal person of private law and public utility, part of the national system of education, founded in 1991, accredited by law in 2002, receiving the qualification "High confidence rating" from ARACIS in 2010, whose mission is to offer high-quality education and research, in an intellectually stimulating environment both for students and for the teaching staff.

The Romanian-American University, founded in 1991, aims to promote the educational values of American academic education while embracing the rich traditions of Romanian education. The initiative to establish the Romanian-American University belonged to the late Ion Smedescu, founder of the Romanian-American University and president of the Romanian-American Foundation for the Promotion of Education and Culture.

The Romanian-American University is an independent institution without being affiliated with or sponsored by an American University.

== History ==
Ion Smedescu was born in the village Obârșia, Cernișoara commune, Vâlcea County, in a rather modest family, from a financial point of view, but extremely "gifted" from another vantage point, as it had 10 children. At the age of 12, understanding the material difficulties that the family was faced with, Smedescu spent some time in an orphanage at Turnu Roșu, only to then study and graduate from the Normal School of Teaching "Andrei Șaguna" in Sibiu, between 1939 and 1947, getting a teacher diploma.

Subsequently, in 1952, he became an economist, after graduating from the Bucharest Academy of Economic Studies. Since education played a fundamental role in his professional success, in 1991, at the age of 67, Smedescu decided to set up the Romanian-American University, thus returning to society some of what he received from it, and wishing in this way to offer, over time, an opportunity for professional and personal fulfillment to other children who would perhaps be as destitute as he used to be, but who were just as filled with ambition and determination to succeed in life.

== Why "Romanian-American"? ==
“The University was set up having as a purpose the promotion of the educational values of the American higher education, against the background of the rich traditions of the Romanian education. In accomplishing this desideratum, the starting point was that in the United States of America, higher education stands on the model of the behavior-driven American society based on the efficient organization of activity, resilient sense of duty, the cultivation of work spirit, self-respect, and respect for the others, fair competition throughout one’s lifetime, competition with all the others and, last but not least, with oneself", as Professor Ion Smedescu declared himself.

- 1991 (11 March) – The Assembly of the establishment of the Romanian-American University took place in Bucharest, when its Statute was approved, which stipulated the establishment of 7 schools: School of Domestic and International Business, Banking and Finance, Management, Hotel and Tourism Economy, Computer Science, Medicine and Public Health, Law, Engineering in design and product aesthetics.
- 1991 (28 March) – the Decision no. 364 of the Ministry of Education and Science approved the establishment of the Romanian-American University.
- 1991 (April 17) – the Ruling no. 295/17.04.1991 of the Court of Law of Sector 1, Bucharest, granted legal personality to the Romanian-American University.
- 1991 (10 June) – the assembly for the establishment of the Romanian-American University's Senate was held, where Ion Smedescu was unanimously elected Rector and was appointed Founding Rector of the Romanian-American University. Moreover, the first management positions were elected according to the law (vice-rectors, Senate scientific secretary, executive manager, deans) and the curricula, enrolment figures, tuition taxes as per education forms and the enrolment fees for admission were also approved.
- 1991 (July) – the organization of the first admission exam, subsequent to which 1,772 students were admitted.
- 1991 (11 December) – the end of 1991 witnessed the enactment and vote of the Constitution of Romania, through each private education was legally recognized as part of the national system of education. Under these new provisions, on the initiative of the late Prof. Ion Smedescu, the RAU Rector, on 11 December 1991, the "Romanian-American Foundation for Promoting Education and Culture" (FRAPEC) was established, by Ruling no.34/22.01.1992 of the Court of Law of 1st Sector, Bucharest. The goal of FRAPEC was "the promotion and dissemination of Romanian cultural and civic education values in America and of American values in Romania". Among the 27 founding members of FRAPEC there were prestigious university professors, researchers, lawyers, economists, medical doctors etc. The foundation took under its auspices the Romanian-American University, in order to abide by the law in effect and elected Ion Smedescu, the RAU Rector, as president.
- 1992 – In February 1992, the university's Center of Scientific Research was established, and in May 1992 the first session of student scientific research presentations was organized.
- 1994 – 1995 – the process of temporary authorization, as per the provisions of the Law no. 88/1993 on the accreditation of higher education institutions and the acknowledgement of diplomas, and as per the Law no. 84/1995 – the law on education.
- 2000 – the School of European Economic Integration Studies was established, temporarily authorized by the G.D. no. 1215/2000.
- 2002 (15 May) – Law no. 274 on the establishment of the Romanian-American University as an accredited higher education institution is published in the Official Gazette and, implicitly, the accreditation of its schools takes place, which are as follows: Management-Marketing, Domestic and International Business, Banking and Finance, Domestic and International Tourism Economics, Computer Science for Business Management, Law, Studies of European Economic Integration.
- 2002 (September) – the first exam after the bachelor studies is organized in the Romanian-American University.
- 2002 – the Ministry of Education and Research approved the organization and development of master programs (post-academic studies with a duration of 3 semesters).
- 2003 (October) – the inauguration of the Romanian-American University's Campus with the attendance of representatives of the country's leadership and of the partner American universities.
- 2004 – A new legal provision (Law no. 288/2004 on the organization of academic studies) led to a major reform of the structure of the Romanian higher education. The law was enforced starting with the academic year 2005–2006 and concerned the Bologna reform and the transfer to the organization of academic studies per 3 cycles: bachelor-master-doctorate.
- 2007 – 2010 – the Bologna reform (2005–2008), required by the enforcement of the provisions of Law no. 288/2004 and other legal requirements, led to the reorganization of the education offer of the Romanian-American University according to the existing study areas, related majors and the number of distributed credits. Equally, new master programs were launched, designed in line with the bachelor programs and accredited by ARACIS, as per G.D. 404/2006. For the first bachelor graduates of economic studies from the Bologna system (July 2008), the university offered 10 master programs (Bologna) accredited according to the law
- 2007 – 2008 – the schools in the economic area of the university became members of the Association of the Economic Schools from Romania (AFER), a renowned professional-scientific body including the most valuable higher education economic institutions in Romania.
- 2008 (5 October) – Ion Smedescu, the Founding Rector of the university passed away; the position was taken over by Ovidiu Folcut, first in interim terms and then, starting from December 2008, permanently, as a result of the elections organized for this purpose.
- 2010 – the institutional assessment and the granting, on 22 July 2010, by the ARACIS Board, in unanimity of votes, of the qualification "High degree of trust", the highest national qualification as regards the quality of educational services rendered by an academic education institution, according to the law.
- 2011 – Diversification of the educational offer through the accreditation of two new bachelor studies programs, exclusively taught in English: "International Business" and "Computer Science for Economics".
- 2011 – The process of evaluation for the classification of the university and ranking of the study programs, as per the provisions of the G.D. 789/2011 on the approval of the Methodology of the evaluation for the classification of universities and ranking of the study programs and as per other legal documents (OMECTS 4072/2011, OMECTS 4174/2011 and OMECTS 5204/2011). According to the provisions of OMECTS 5262/2011 on the acknowledgement of the results on the classification of universities, the Romanian-American University is education-focused.

The results of the ranking of the study programs valid for the academic year 2011–2012, according to the law, were:

1. Area – International economic relations, Category A (program of excellence according to the law)
2. Area – Finance, Category A (program of excellence according to the law)
3. Area – Management, Category B
4. Area – Marketing, Category B
5. Area – Business administration, Category B
6. Area – Cybernetics, statistics and economic computer science, Category B
7. Area – Law, Category D
8. Area – Accounting, Category E
- 2014 – the first master studies programs exclusively taught in English are launched: "Finance" – providing a double degree, unfolding in partnership with the University of Siena, "Strategic Marketing", and "Computer Science for Business".
- 2015 – the institutional assessment and the granting, on 24 August 2015, by the ARACIS Board, of the qualification "High degree of trust", the highest national assessment regarding the quality of educational services rendered by an academic education institution, according to the law. The creation of the International Business and Entrepreneurship master studies program.
- 2017 – the establishment of the School of Physical Education, Sports and Kinesiotherapy and the authorization of two new bachelor studies programs: “Physical Education and Sports” and “Kinesiotherapy”. The accreditation, within the schools of economic profile, of 3 new master studies programs: “International economic relations and economic diplomacy”, “Business Management in Tourism and Aviation”, and “Logistic Management”.
