= Maya Delilah =

English singer-songwriter

- Born: Maya Delilah Shoul; 5 May 2000 (age 26); London, England
- Genres: Pop; R&B; jazz; soul
- Occupations: Singer; songwriter; guitarist
- Instruments: Vocals; guitar
- Years active: 2020–present
- Label: Blue Note Records
- Website: www.mayadelilah.com

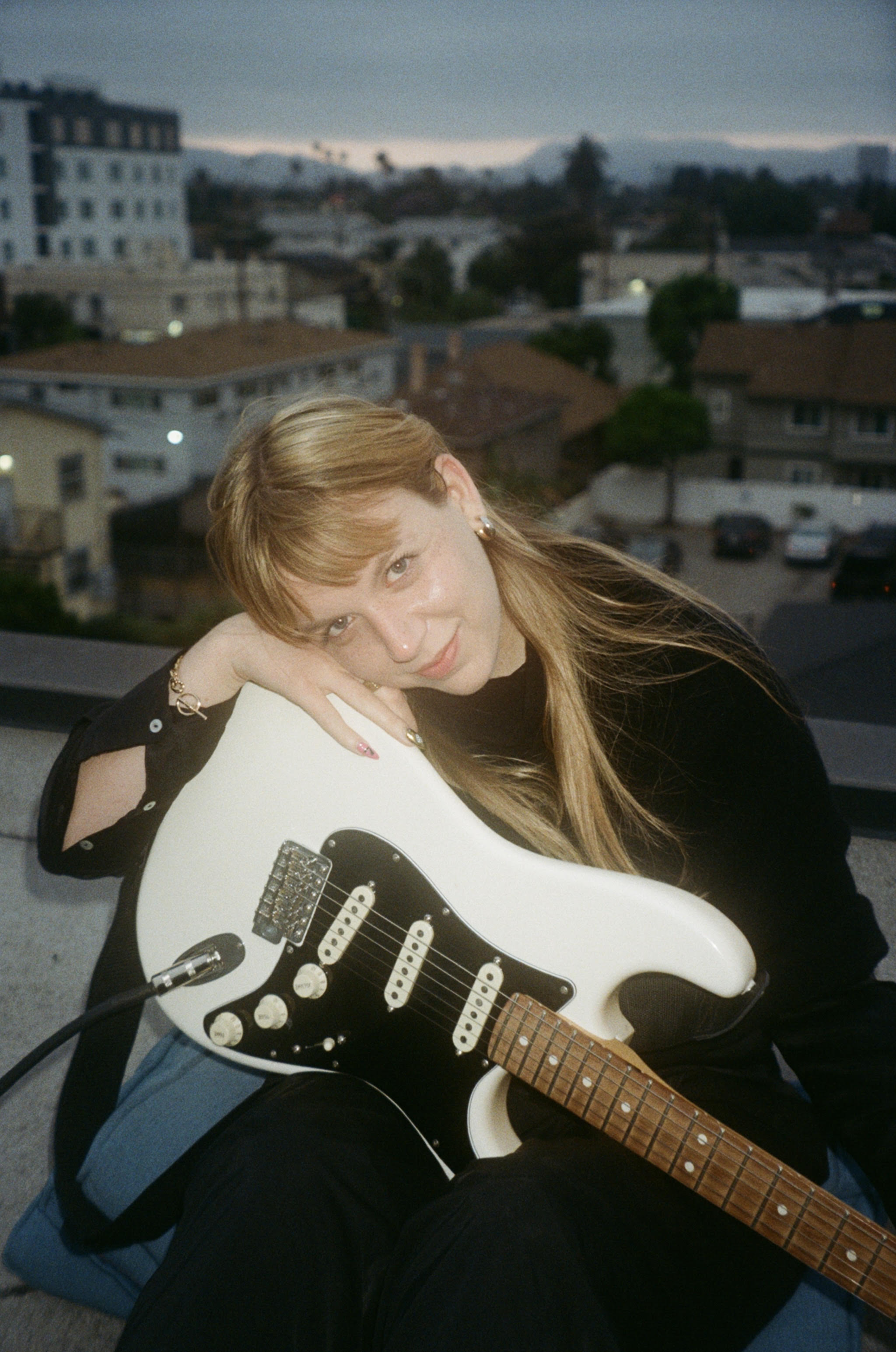
Maya Delilah in Los Angeles 2025

Maya Delilah Shoul (born 5 May 2000) is an English singer and songwriter and guitarist, born and raised in North London. Growing up playing in Jazz youth clubs and busking around London, Delilah first gained attraction as a finalist of The Mayor Of London's Gigs Big Busk competition. In 2016 Delilah joined the prestigious BRIT school in Croydon. After starting to self release music during Covid, Delilah began to build a fast growing social media following and shortly after signed to jazz record label Blue Note Records since 2022.

== Career ==
Delilah was born and raised in Islington, London. When she was 15, she was a finalist in The Mayor of London's Gigs Big Busk, the UK's biggest annual street music competition. She attended the BRIT School.

In 2020, lockdown put a pause on the background session work Maya had begun to do within her community of music-making friends, so she turned to livestreams and TikToks where she build up a devoted following with clips where she would sit cross-legged on the floor, a bed, or a table. Over the course of two self-released EPs (2020's Oh Boy, 2021's It's Not Me It's You), she amassed more than 50 million streams of fan favourites like 'Breakup Season featuring Samm Henshaw' and 'Tangerine Dream' and sold out her first London headline show at The Jazz Cafe.

Maya began releasing music on Blue Note/Capitol Records in 2022, reinterpreting Cassandra Wilson's cover of Neil Young's Harvest Moon for Blue Note Re:imagined II, followed by her debut album The Long Way Round. The album charted number 2 on the overseas Billboard Charts in Japan, where shortly after Delilah played Fuji Rock Festival to her biggest crowd yet. Delilah was also brought out as a guest for headliners Vulfpeck, performing to 50,000 people.

Following the release of her first full-length album, Delilah was named a 2025 Spotify Artist to Watch and a Fender Next Artist.

Her style has been described as a "unique blend of jazz, soul, and pop", and she has listed Anderson .Paak, Tyler, The Creator, John Mayer, and Derek Trucks as musical influences.

== Discography ==
=== Albums ===
- The Long Way Round (2025)

=== EPs ===
- Oh Boy (2020)
- It's Not Me, It's You (2021)

=== Singles ===
- "Pretty Face" (2022)
- "Silver Lining" (2023)
- "Necklace" (2023)
- "Actress" (2023)
- "Look at the State of Me Now" (2024)
- "Begin Again" (2024)
- "Squeeze" (2025)
- "Maya, Maya, Maya" (2025)
- "California" (2025)
- "BEEN HERE BEFORE" (with Aquilo) (2026)
