= Association of Norwegian Architects =

Organization for graduate architects

The National Association of Norwegian Architects (Norwegian: Norske arkitekters landsforbund, NAL) is a country-wide Norwegian organization for graduate architects. Established in 1911, as of 2015 the organization had some 4,100 members. In addition to its central office in Oslo, it has 14 regional branches. Its president is Tina Larsen.

The NAL strives to improve conditions for the profession of architecture. It publishes the periodical: Arkitektur.
