= Zand (musician) =

English musician

- Born: Zander Sweeney; Blackpool, United Kingdom
- Genres: pop; alternative rock; noise pop; industrial
- Instrument: vocals
- Years active: 2018-

Zander Sweeney, better known by their stage name Zand (typically stylized in all caps), is an English pop musician from Blackpool. Zand is best known for their eccentric fashion sense, politically charged lyrics, and unique musical style, which they describe as "ugly pop."

== Early life ==
Zand was born in Blackpool, England. Their family moved to Ireland when they were four, then back to Blackpool when they were twelve. As a child, they experienced bullying in school because of their appearance and interests. Zand dealt with self-harm and depression as a teenager as a result of the bullying they faced. They found inspiration from a number of musicians, including Britney Spears, Rihanna, Ciara, Paramore, Fall Out Boy, My Chemical Romance, Linkin Park, Millionaires, and Imogen Heap. Zand also briefly posted music to YouTube under the name Seafoal.

At 18, they did glamor modelling and camming. This experience partially inspired their song "Slut Money."

== Musical career ==
Zand describes their music as "ugly pop." They use this term to both describe their lyrics, which explore complex political and social issues, and their instrumental style. They released the EP Ugly Pop in 2021, featuring the single "Slut Money." This song focuses on sex work and whorephobia, or bias against sex workers. Ugly Pop also features "Inappropriate," produced with UK musician Daktyl. Zand's brother, a guitarist, also contributed to "Inappropriate."

Zand was also a featured artist on the 2022 song "Kill All Predators" by English band Banshee. (Note: No connection to American heavy metal band Banshee.) Many of their songs focus on retribution against violent abusers and misogynistic men. Another such song is "Battery Acid," which discusses intimate partner violence. Their songs also contain general themes of resisting societal oppression.

They released their next EP, SEWERSTAR, in 2023. One single, "DTF", (Note: "Down to fuck") features multiple vibrators as instruments. Zand's lyrics often highlight queer sexuality with a focus on liberation and defiance in the face of societal norms. That same year, Zand collaborated with MP Jeremy Corbyn to raise money for Music for the Many, a UK nonprofit focused on music education.

In 2024, their song "Cocktail Molotov" was featured on an episode of Arcane.

== Personal life ==
Zand came out as trans and nonbinary in 2015, after which they faced harassment. They discuss often being harassed in public because of their appearance.

Zand has been open about their experience living with ADHD, autism, OCD, and borderline personality disorder.

== Discography ==
=== EPs ===
Title	Details
Ugly Pop	Released: 2021; Label: Self-produced; Formats: Digital download
Sewerstar	Released: 2023; Label: Self-produced; Formats: Digital download
