= List of South African provinces by life expectancy =

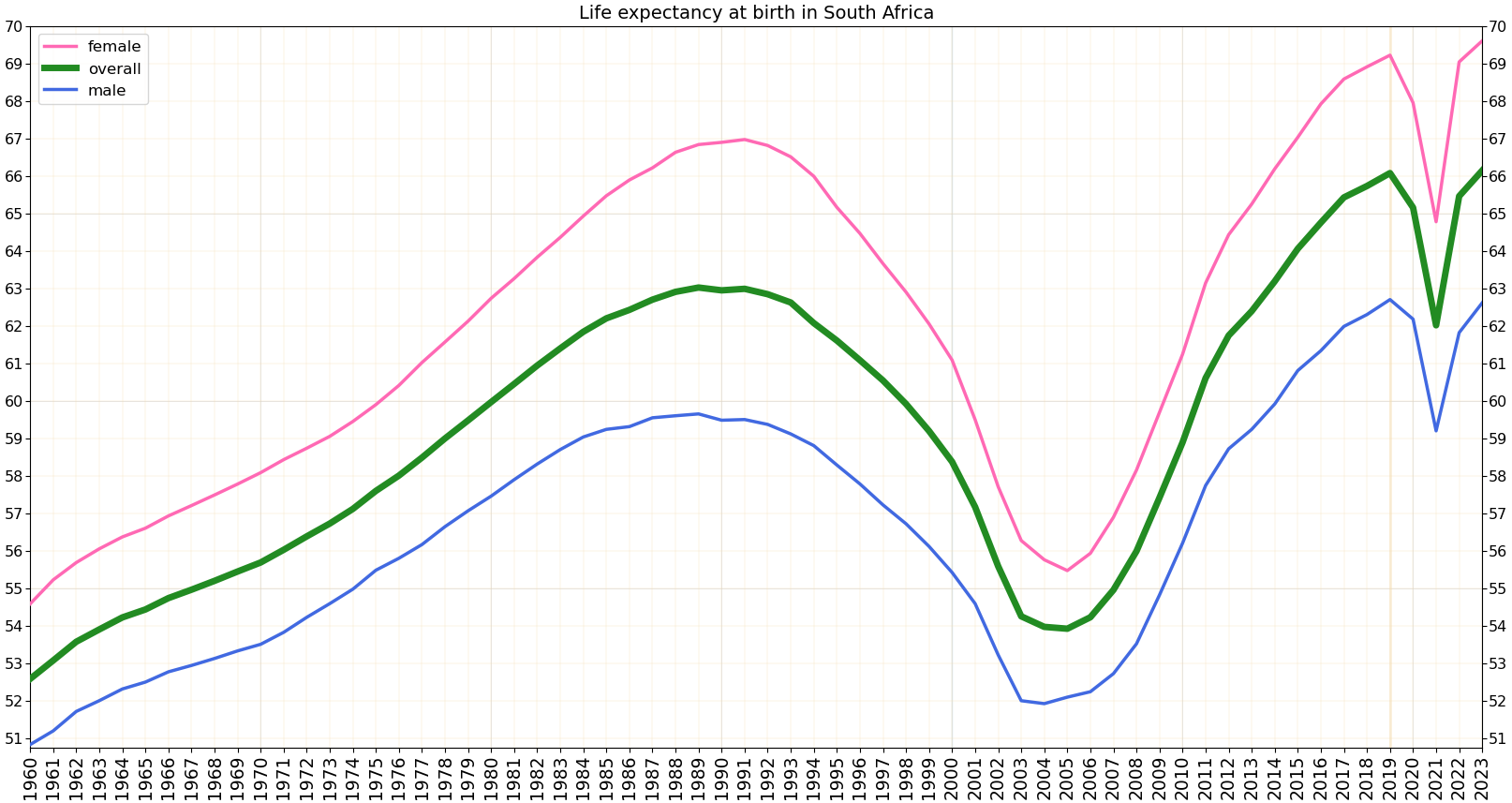
Development of life expectancy in South Africa according to estimation of the World Bank Group

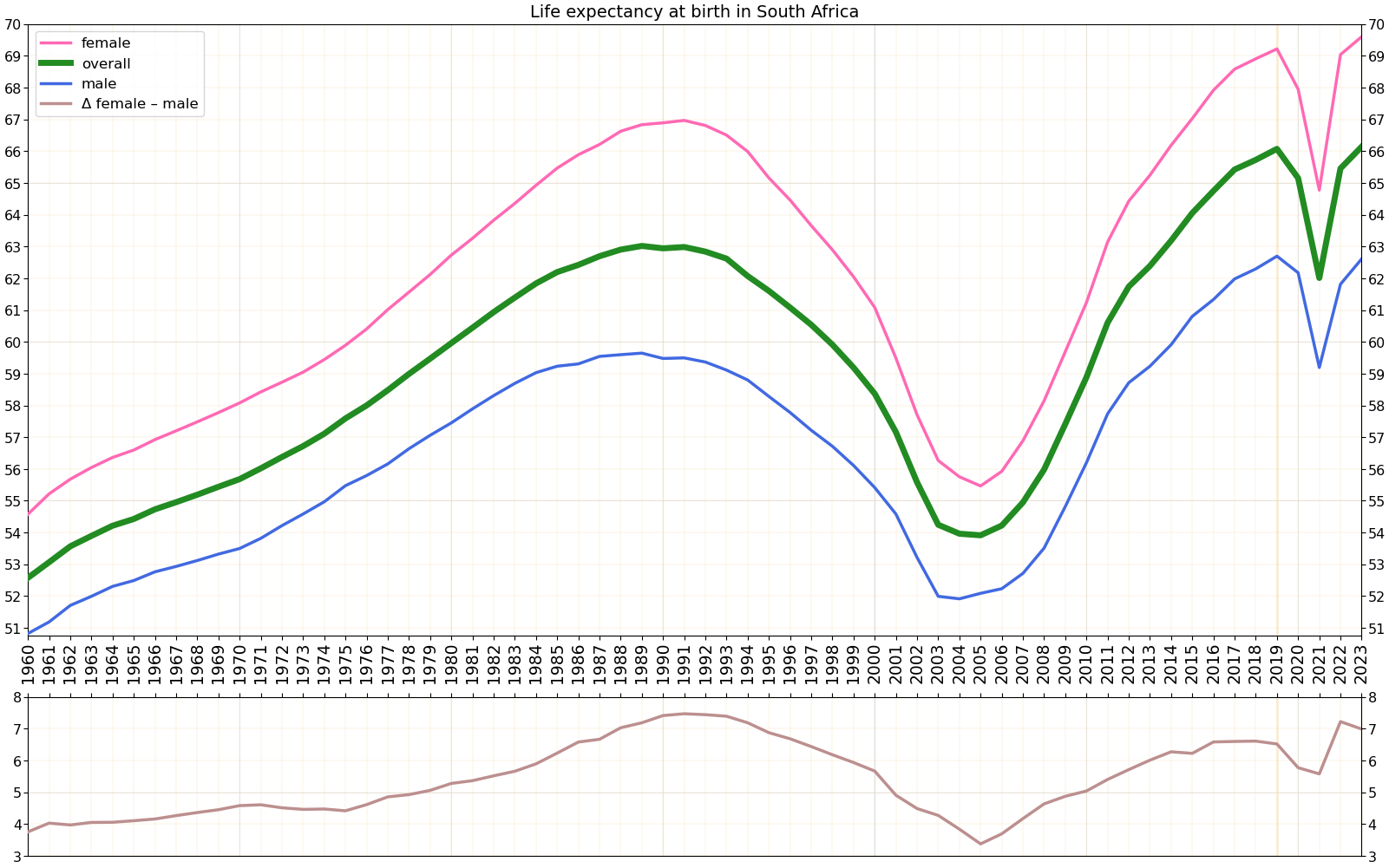
Life expectancy with calculated gender gap

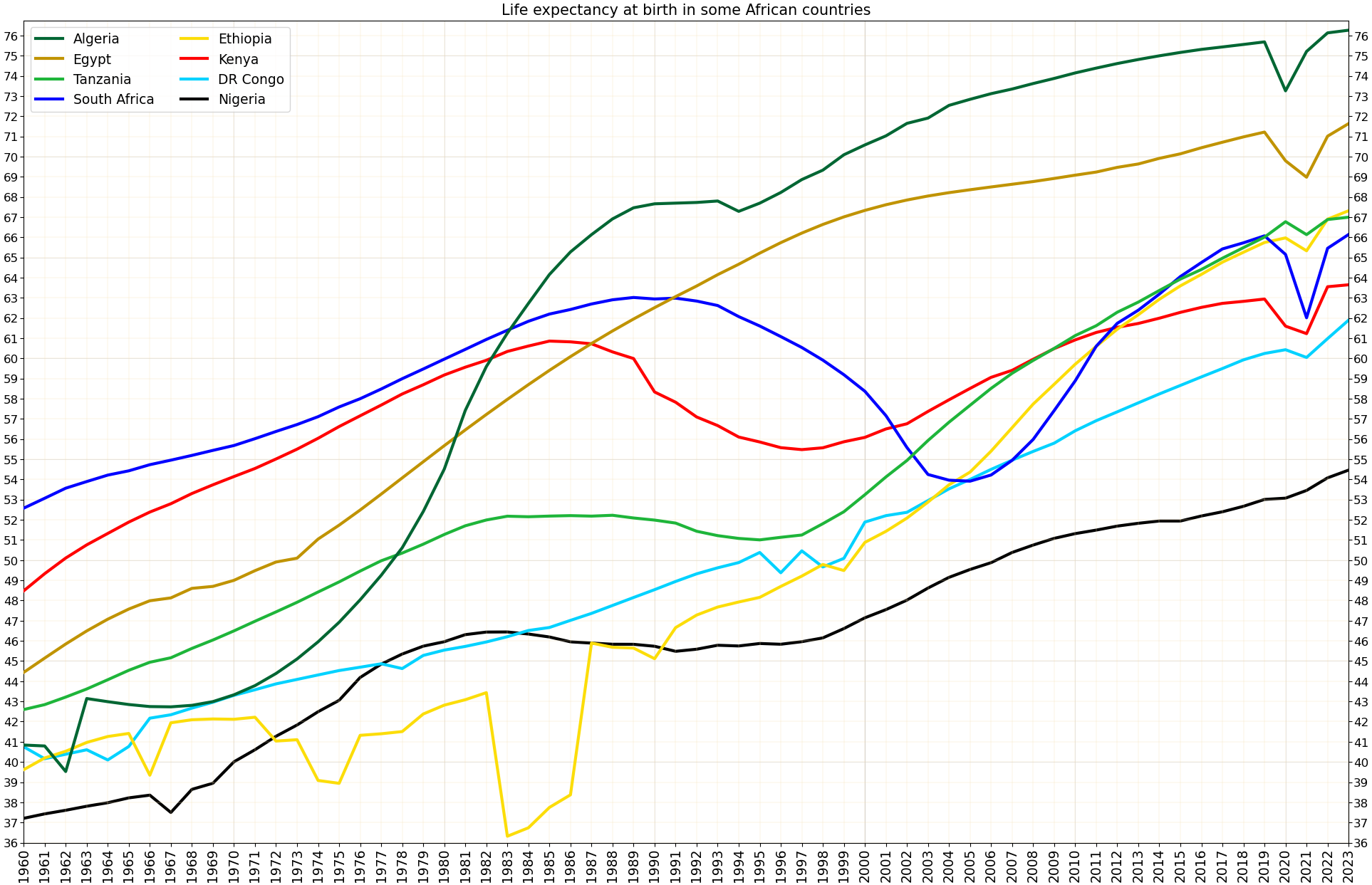
Development of life expectancy in South Africa in comparison to some other African countries

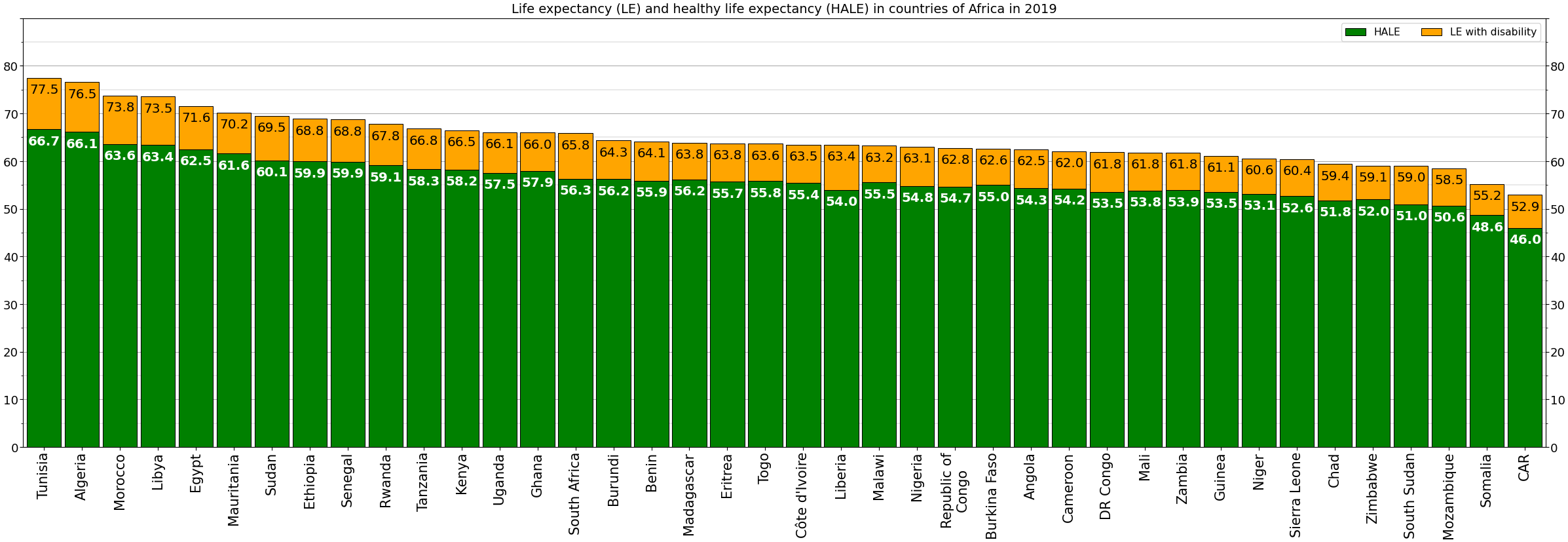
Life expectancy and healthy life expectancy in Africa on the background of other countries of Africa in 2019

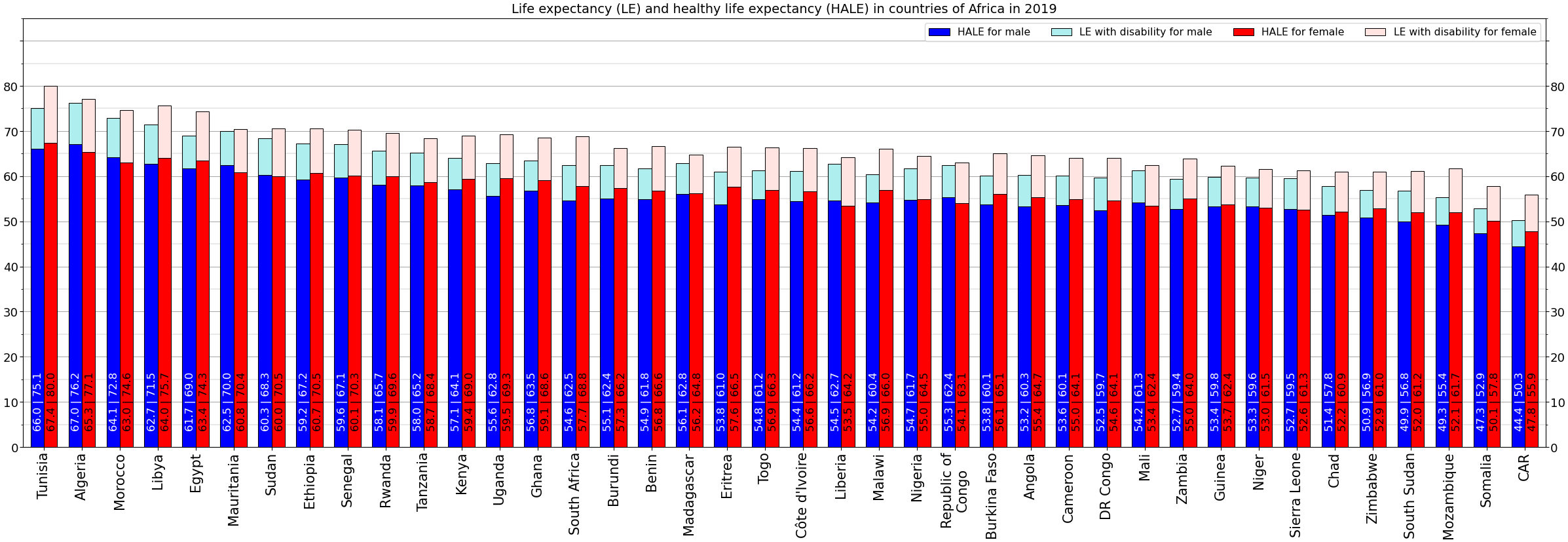
Life expectancy and healthy life expectancy for males and females

This article lists the provinces of South Africa by their life expectancy at birth according to data by Statistics South Africa.

== Global Data Lab (2019–2022) ==
region	2019				2019 →2021	2021	2021 →2022	2022				2019 →2022
region	overall	male	female	F Δ M	2019 →2021	overall	2021 →2022	overall	male	female	F Δ M	2019 →2022
South Africa on average	66.18	62.83	69.11	6.28	−3.84	62.34	−0.86	61.48	58.60	64.18	5.58	−4.70
Limpopo	69.12	65.50	72.52	7.02	−4.01	65.11	−0.90	64.21	61.08	67.35	6.27	−4.91
Western Cape	67.48	64.03	70.63	6.60	−3.91	63.57	−0.87	62.70	59.71	65.59	5.88	−4.78
KwaZulu Natal	67.33	63.89	70.45	6.56	−3.90	63.43	−0.88	62.55	59.58	65.43	5.85	−4.78
Gauteng	67.03	63.61	70.10	6.49	−3.88	63.15	−0.88	62.27	59.32	65.11	5.79	−4.76
Northern Cape	66.11	62.78	69.04	6.26	−3.83	62.28	−0.86	61.42	58.55	64.12	5.57	−4.69
Free State	64.04	60.87	66.61	5.74	−3.71	60.33	−0.83	59.50	56.76	61.86	5.10	−4.54
Eastern Cape	64.00	60.83	66.56	5.73	−3.70	60.30	−0.84	59.46	56.73	61.82	5.09	−4.54
North West	63.89	60.72	66.43	5.71	−3.70	60.19	−0.83	59.36	56.63	61.69	5.06	−4.53
Mpumalanga	62.95	59.84	65.31	5.47	−3.65	59.30	−0.82	58.48	55.80	60.66	4.86	−4.47

Data source: Global Data Lab

== Alternative estimate ==
=== Males ===
Provincial life expectancy at birth (males), 2001–2021
Rank	Province	2001–2006	2006–2011	2011–2016	2016–2021 (est.)
1	Western Cape	56.6	61.1	63.9	65.7
2	Gauteng	55.4	56.5	61.6	63.8
3	Limpopo	54.3	54.4	59.3	61.8
4	Northern Cape	51.9	52.9	56.8	60.4
4	Mpumalanga	52.4	53.3	57.8	60.4
6	Eastern Cape	52.3	53.0	57.3	59.6
7	North West	49.1	50.3	56.6	57.9
8	KwaZulu-Natal	47.5	48.3	54.6	57.1
9	Free State	45.6	46.3	53.1	54.6

=== Females ===
Provincial life expectancy at birth (females), 2001–2021
Rank	Province	2001–2006	2006–2011	2011–2016	2016–2021 (est.)
1	Western Cape	64.5	67.2	70.6	71.1
2	Gauteng	59.2	60.9	66.6	69.2
3	Limpopo	57.7	58.6	65.1	67.4
4	Eastern Cape	56.8	58.6	64.0	67.1
5	Mpumalanga	56.1	57.6	63.5	66.2
6	Northern Cape	57.2	58.5	63.3	66.0
7	North West	53.3	55.0	62.6	65.2
8	KwaZulu-Natal	52.6	54.4	60.9	63.7
9	Free State	49.2	50.7	58.6	61.3

== See also ==
- List of African countries by life expectancy
