= List of African countries by life expectancy =

African countries by life expectancy

This is a list of African countries by life expectancy.

== United Nations (2023) ==
Estimation of the analytical agency of the UN.

=== UN: Estimate of life expectancy for various ages in 2023 ===
Countries and territories	Life expectancy for population in general							Life expectancy for male				Life expectancy for female				Sex gap				Population (thous.)	
Countries and territories	at birth	bonus 0→15	at 15	bonus 15→65	at 65	bonus 65→80	at 80	at birth	at 15	at 65	at 80	at birth	at 15	at 65	at 80	at birth	at 15	at 65	at 80	Population (thous.)	
Réunion	83.55	0.60	69.14	3.10	22.24	3.67	10.91	80.53	66.16	20.37	9.88	86.33	71.89	23.83	11.60	5.80	5.73	3.46	1.72	875	(Réunion)
Saint Helena	76.79	1.24	63.03	3.60	16.62	5.65	7.28	73.87	60.30	14.75	6.19	80.62	66.66	19.26	8.58	6.75	6.36	4.52	2.39	5	(Saint Helena)
Tunisia	76.51	0.99	62.50	3.88	16.39	5.70	7.09	73.92	59.98	14.88	6.41	79.15	65.07	17.79	7.57	5.23	5.09	2.91	1.16	12200	(Tunisia)
Algeria	76.26	1.82	63.09	3.29	16.38	5.58	6.96	74.89	61.83	15.39	6.39	77.70	64.41	17.37	7.45	2.80	2.58	1.98	1.05	46164	(Algeria)
Cabo Verde	76.06	0.99	62.05	4.61	16.65	5.39	7.05	72.86	58.89	14.92	6.21	79.21	65.14	17.88	7.46	6.35	6.25	2.96	1.25	522	(Cape Verde)
Mayotte	76.05	0.99	62.05	4.13	16.18	5.79	6.97	74.09	60.17	14.94	6.45	78.33	64.22	17.66	7.62	4.25	4.05	2.72	1.17	316	(Mayotte)
Morocco	74.91	1.50	61.81	4.15	15.96	5.91	6.87	73.17	59.77	14.51	6.08	77.60	64.00	17.43	7.48	4.43	4.23	2.93	1.41	37713	(Morocco)
Mauritius	74.93	1.22	61.14	6.34	17.48	6.13	8.61	71.94	58.22	16.16	8.06	78.18	64.32	18.71	9.05	6.25	6.10	2.55	0.99	1274	(Mauritius)
World	73.17	3.29	61.46	6.11	17.57	5.75	8.31	70.55	58.91	16.01	7.43	75.89	64.09	18.98	8.96	5.34	5.18	2.97	1.53	8091735	
Seychelles	72.86	1.21	59.07	6.12	15.19	6.58	6.78	69.94	56.21	13.57	6.03	76.52	62.66	16.87	7.22	6.58	6.45	3.30	1.18	128	(Seychelles)
Egypt	71.63	1.53	58.16	5.16	13.33	7.13	5.46	69.49	56.10	12.13	5.06	73.81	60.25	14.34	5.70	4.32	4.14	2.21	0.64	114536	(Egypt)
Western Sahara	71.39	2.35	58.73	5.60	14.33	6.65	5.98	69.69	57.28	13.45	5.64	73.55	60.63	15.31	6.35	3.86	3.35	1.87	0.71	580	
Sao Tome and Principe	69.72	1.23	55.95	8.38	14.33	7.24	6.57	66.24	52.45	12.54	5.82	73.73	59.97	16.12	7.06	7.49	7.52	3.58	1.24	231	(São Tomé and Príncipe)
Libya	69.34	3.79	58.12	7.28	15.41	6.41	6.82	68.27	56.97	14.18	6.31	70.42	59.29	16.60	7.28	2.15	2.32	2.43	0.97	7306	(Libya)
Botswana	69.16	3.10	57.27	7.61	14.88	7.27	7.15	66.67	54.90	13.51	6.12	71.70	59.66	16.07	7.80	5.03	4.76	2.57	1.68	2480	(Botswana)
Senegal	68.68	3.10	56.78	6.74	13.53	6.62	5.15	66.79	55.13	12.82	4.91	70.75	58.60	14.28	5.41	3.96	3.47	1.46	0.50	18078	(Senegal)
Eritrea	68.62	3.35	56.98	7.81	14.79	6.59	6.38	66.51	55.21	14.10	6.06	70.66	58.62	15.34	6.61	4.15	3.41	1.24	0.54	3470	(Eritrea)
Mauritania	68.48	3.10	56.59	6.92	13.51	7.30	5.81	66.50	54.81	12.46	5.40	70.48	58.35	14.52	6.16	3.98	3.54	2.06	0.76	5022	(Mauritania)
Gabon	68.34	3.07	56.41	8.09	14.50	7.19	6.69	65.91	54.18	13.59	6.38	71.05	58.91	15.36	6.94	5.15	4.73	1.76	0.56	2485	(Gabon)
Uganda	68.25	3.21	56.46	9.56	16.02	7.46	8.48	65.27	53.66	14.21	7.06	71.12	59.10	17.42	9.32	5.85	5.44	3.21	2.27	48657	(Uganda)
Rwanda	67.78	2.99	55.78	8.14	13.92	7.30	6.22	65.49	53.63	13.02	5.90	69.89	57.71	14.58	6.40	4.39	4.08	1.56	0.49	13954	(Rwanda)
Namibia	67.39	3.00	55.38	9.49	14.88	7.50	7.38	63.33	51.45	12.63	5.70	71.34	59.17	16.50	8.22	8.01	7.73	3.87	2.52	2963	(Namibia)
Malawi	67.35	3.20	55.55	8.49	14.05	7.42	6.47	64.07	52.47	12.61	5.71	70.56	58.53	15.24	6.94	6.49	6.06	2.64	1.23	21104	(Malawi)
Ethiopia	67.31	4.07	56.39	8.24	14.63	6.69	6.31	64.08	53.66	13.62	5.83	70.73	59.20	15.53	6.68	6.65	5.54	1.92	0.85	128692	(Ethiopia)
Tanzania	67.00	3.15	55.15	9.60	14.75	7.55	7.30	64.20	52.45	12.97	5.93	69.78	57.79	16.29	8.31	5.58	5.33	3.32	2.38	66618	(Tanzania)
Comoros	66.78	3.73	55.51	7.61	13.12	7.53	5.65	64.79	53.63	12.10	5.28	68.93	57.54	14.11	5.96	4.15	3.90	2.00	0.69	850	(Comoros)
Zambia	66.35	4.17	55.52	7.32	12.84	7.46	5.29	63.94	53.44	11.92	4.82	68.67	57.48	13.51	5.58	4.74	4.03	1.60	0.76	20724	(Zambia)
Sudan	66.33	4.43	55.76	8.68	14.44	6.79	6.23	63.27	53.04	13.68	5.86	69.63	58.65	15.36	6.61	6.35	5.61	1.68	0.75	50043	(Sudan)
South Africa	66.14	2.87	54.01	10.95	14.96	7.61	7.57	62.61	50.55	13.15	6.65	69.60	57.37	16.30	8.04	6.99	6.82	3.14	1.39	63212	(South Africa)
Djibouti	65.99	4.58	55.57	8.76	14.33	6.86	6.19	63.52	53.48	13.54	5.80	68.51	57.67	15.02	6.48	4.99	4.19	1.48	0.68	1153	(Djibouti)
Gambia	65.86	4.22	55.08	9.05	14.13	6.95	6.08	64.17	53.67	13.59	5.82	67.53	56.45	14.60	6.30	3.36	2.78	1.01	0.48	2698	(The Gambia)
Congo, Rep.	65.77	3.18	53.96	9.23	13.19	7.64	5.83	64.12	52.45	12.45	5.64	67.46	55.49	13.87	5.98	3.34	3.04	1.42	0.33	6183	(Republic of the Congo)
Ghana	65.50	4.08	54.58	9.42	14.00	7.05	6.05	63.13	52.56	13.25	5.67	67.94	56.63	14.65	6.32	4.81	4.07	1.40	0.65	33788	(Ghana)
Angola	64.62	5.06	54.67	8.77	13.45	7.53	5.98	62.10	52.41	12.48	5.55	67.14	56.92	14.28	6.26	5.04	4.51	1.80	0.71	36750	(Angola)
Eswatini	64.12	3.84	52.96	11.28	14.24	7.70	6.94	61.19	50.10	13.12	6.57	66.95	55.69	15.07	7.17	5.77	5.59	1.95	0.60	1231	(Eswatini)
Guinea-Bissau	64.08	5.52	54.60	9.07	13.67	7.43	6.10	61.66	52.44	12.71	5.70	66.36	56.55	14.35	6.38	4.71	4.11	1.64	0.68	2153	(Guinea-Bissau)
Africa	63.84	5.50	54.34	9.56	13.91	7.34	6.24	61.81	52.48	12.99	5.72	65.91	56.22	14.72	6.62	4.09	3.73	1.73	0.91	1480771	
Equatorial Guinea	63.71	5.51	54.21	8.99	13.21	7.61	5.82	62.04	52.87	12.66	5.62	65.66	55.84	13.72	5.97	3.62	2.98	1.06	0.35	1848	(Equatorial Guinea)
Cameroon	63.70	5.34	54.04	9.03	13.07	7.58	5.65	61.52	52.12	12.36	5.50	65.94	56.00	13.70	5.76	4.42	3.88	1.34	0.26	28373	(Cameroon)
Burundi	63.65	4.78	53.43	10.22	13.65	7.26	5.91	61.60	51.64	12.98	5.55	65.70	55.18	14.19	6.14	4.10	3.54	1.21	0.58	13689	(Burundi)
Kenya	63.65	3.18	51.83	12.19	14.02	7.94	6.96	61.46	49.74	12.90	6.31	65.92	53.99	14.97	7.34	4.46	4.24	2.07	1.03	55339	(Kenya)
Madagascar	63.63	5.77	54.40	9.52	13.92	7.08	6.00	61.94	53.01	13.40	5.74	65.38	55.81	14.39	6.22	3.44	2.81	0.99	0.48	31196	(Madagascar)
Mozambique	63.61	4.96	53.57	9.04	12.61	7.59	5.20	60.30	50.37	11.66	4.98	66.54	56.32	13.13	5.37	6.24	5.95	1.48	0.39	33635	(Mozambique)
Zimbabwe	62.77	3.51	51.28	11.94	13.22	8.11	6.33	60.23	48.82	11.88	5.54	65.01	53.40	14.29	6.86	4.79	4.58	2.40	1.32	16341	(Zimbabwe)
Togo	62.74	5.06	52.80	9.47	12.27	7.44	4.71	62.54	52.67	12.09	4.65	62.92	52.90	12.43	4.76	0.39	0.23	0.34	0.11	9304	(Togo)
Liberia	62.16	5.38	52.54	9.84	12.38	7.98	5.36	60.88	51.58	12.15	5.39	63.44	53.47	12.57	5.33	2.57	1.89	0.42	−0.06	5493	(Liberia)
Cote d'Ivoire	61.94	5.09	52.03	11.11	13.15	8.12	6.27	60.02	50.56	12.30	5.81	64.13	53.75	14.08	6.67	4.12	3.19	1.78	0.86	31166	(Ivory Coast)
DR Congo	61.90	6.42	53.31	10.28	13.60	7.28	5.88	59.79	51.58	12.97	5.55	64.04	55.05	14.15	6.12	4.25	3.47	1.17	0.57	105790	(Democratic Republic of the Congo)
Sierra Leone	61.79	7.46	54.24	8.35	12.59	7.75	5.34	60.06	52.92	11.91	5.06	63.50	55.54	13.18	5.56	3.44	2.62	1.27	0.50	8461	(Sierra Leone)
Niger	61.18	8.74	54.93	8.02	12.95	7.02	4.96	60.26	54.06	12.51	4.80	62.13	55.81	13.34	5.08	1.87	1.75	0.83	0.28	26160	(Niger)
Burkina Faso	61.09	6.22	52.31	10.08	12.38	7.38	4.77	58.92	50.23	11.72	4.53	63.22	54.31	12.87	4.91	4.30	4.08	1.15	0.38	23026	(Burkina Faso)
Benin	60.77	6.86	52.63	10.75	13.38	7.41	5.79	59.35	51.45	12.92	5.53	62.21	53.79	13.76	5.96	2.86	2.34	0.84	0.44	14111	(Benin)
Guinea	60.74	7.74	53.48	10.14	13.63	7.25	5.88	59.52	52.55	13.25	5.67	61.90	54.31	13.91	6.02	2.38	1.76	0.66	0.35	14405	(Guinea)
Mali	60.44	7.19	52.63	9.71	12.34	7.40	4.75	59.04	51.36	11.89	4.59	61.90	53.95	12.75	4.87	2.86	2.59	0.87	0.28	23769	(Mali)
Somalia	58.82	8.28	52.09	11.40	13.49	7.36	5.85	56.35	49.77	12.90	5.55	61.39	54.48	14.00	6.07	5.04	4.72	1.10	0.51	18359	(Somalia)
South Sudan	57.62	8.34	50.95	12.03	12.98	7.65	5.63	54.64	48.21	12.05	5.14	60.63	53.64	13.71	5.93	5.99	5.43	1.66	0.80	11483	(South Sudan)
CAR	57.41	6.89	49.30	13.55	12.85	8.43	6.28	55.26	47.41	11.89	5.60	59.29	50.86	13.65	6.74	4.03	3.46	1.77	1.14	5152	(Central African Republic)
Lesotho	57.38	5.02	47.40	15.46	12.86	8.67	6.53	54.62	44.77	11.33	5.65	60.01	49.85	13.86	7.00	5.39	5.09	2.53	1.35	2311	(Lesotho)
Chad	55.07	8.68	48.75	13.50	12.25	8.04	5.29	53.20	47.11	11.69	4.98	57.01	50.41	12.75	5.53	3.82	3.30	1.07	0.55	19319	(Chad)
Nigeria	54.46	9.01	48.48	13.67	12.14	8.09	5.23	54.18	48.20	11.99	5.11	54.74	48.74	12.28	5.33	0.57	0.54	0.29	0.22	227883	(Nigeria)

=== UN: Change of life expectancy from 2019 to 2023 ===
Countries and territories	2023				Historical data									Recovery from COVID-19: 2019→2023	Population (thous.)	
Countries and territories	All	Male	Female	Sex gap	2019	2019 →2020	2020	2020 →2021	2021	2021 →2022	2022	2022 →2023	2023	Recovery from COVID-19: 2019→2023	Population (thous.)	
Réunion	83.55	80.53	86.33	5.80	82.32	0.26	82.58	−1.08	81.50	0.00	81.50	2.05	83.55	1.23	875	(Réunion)
Saint Helena	76.79	73.87	80.62	6.75	76.68	0.21	76.89	−0.13	76.77	−0.03	76.73	0.05	76.79	0.10	5	(Saint Helena)
Tunisia	76.51	73.92	79.15	5.23	75.60	−0.59	75.00	−2.11	72.89	3.16	76.05	0.46	76.51	0.91	12200	(Tunisia)
Algeria	76.26	74.89	77.70	2.80	75.68	−2.42	73.26	1.95	75.21	0.92	76.13	0.13	76.26	0.58	46164	(Algeria)
Cabo Verde	76.06	72.86	79.21	6.35	75.45	−1.63	73.82	0.61	74.42	1.48	75.91	0.15	76.06	0.61	522	(Cape Verde)
Mayotte	76.05	74.09	78.33	4.25	76.10	−1.89	74.21	−1.39	72.82	2.30	75.13	0.93	76.05	−0.05	316	(Mayotte)
Morocco	75.31	73.17	77.60	4.43	74.25	−1.11	73.13	0.25	73.39	1.78	75.16	0.15	75.31	1.07	37713	(Morocco)
Mauritius	74.93	71.94	78.18	6.25	74.18	0.48	74.66	−1.75	72.90	0.64	73.54	1.38	74.93	0.74	1274	(Mauritius)
World	73.17	70.55	75.89	5.34	72.61	−0.69	71.92	−1.05	70.86	1.77	72.64	0.53	73.17	0.56	8091735	
Seychelles	72.86	69.94	76.52	6.58	72.12	1.97	74.09	−2.87	71.22	0.03	71.25	1.61	72.86	0.74	128	(Seychelles)
Egypt	71.63	69.49	73.81	4.32	71.21	−1.42	69.79	−0.81	68.98	2.03	71.01	0.62	71.63	0.42	114536	(Egypt)
Western Sahara	71.39	69.69	73.55	3.86	70.38	0.23	70.61	0.27	70.89	0.26	71.14	0.24	71.39	1.00	580	
Sao Tome and Principe	69.72	66.24	73.73	7.49	68.04	−0.06	67.98	0.05	68.03	1.21	69.24	0.48	69.72	1.68	231	(São Tomé and Príncipe)
Libya	69.34	68.27	70.42	2.15	72.94	−0.55	72.39	−0.33	72.06	2.40	74.46	−5.12	69.34	−3.60	7306	(Libya)
Botswana	69.16	66.67	71.70	5.03	67.17	0.48	67.64	−4.34	63.30	5.45	68.75	0.41	69.16	2.00	2480	(Botswana)
Senegal	68.68	66.79	70.75	3.96	67.67	−0.17	67.50	−0.63	66.87	0.92	67.79	0.90	68.68	1.01	18078	(Senegal)
Eritrea	68.62	66.51	70.66	4.15	67.31	−0.33	66.98	−0.04	66.94	0.85	67.79	0.83	68.62	1.32	3470	(Eritrea)
Mauritania	68.48	66.50	70.48	3.98	67.64	−0.85	66.79	−0.03	66.76	1.52	68.28	0.20	68.48	0.84	5022	(Mauritania)
Gabon	68.34	65.91	71.05	5.15	67.34	−0.26	67.07	0.00	67.07	0.64	67.71	0.62	68.34	1.00	2485	(Gabon)
Uganda	68.25	65.27	71.12	5.85	66.35	0.06	66.41	0.04	66.45	1.23	67.67	0.58	68.25	1.90	48657	(Uganda)
Rwanda	67.78	65.49	69.89	4.39	66.69	0.26	66.95	−0.10	66.85	0.68	67.53	0.26	67.78	1.09	13954	(Rwanda)
Namibia	67.39	63.33	71.34	8.01	63.55	0.53	64.07	−3.22	60.85	3.34	64.19	3.19	67.39	3.84	2963	(Namibia)
Malawi	67.35	64.07	70.56	6.49	65.00	0.22	65.22	−0.43	64.78	1.25	66.04	1.32	67.35	2.36	21104	(Malawi)
Ethiopia	67.31	64.08	70.73	6.65	65.74	0.23	65.97	−0.64	65.33	1.57	66.90	0.42	67.31	1.57	128692	(Ethiopia)
Tanzania	67.00	64.20	69.78	5.58	66.01	0.76	66.77	−0.64	66.13	0.75	66.88	0.12	67.00	0.99	66618	(Tanzania)
Comoros	66.78	64.79	68.93	4.15	65.66	0.09	65.76	−0.56	65.20	1.28	66.48	0.30	66.78	1.11	850	(Comoros)
Zambia	66.35	63.94	68.67	4.74	62.91	0.45	63.36	−1.00	62.36	2.92	65.28	1.07	66.35	3.44	20724	(Zambia)
Sudan	66.33	63.27	69.63	6.35	65.80	−0.68	65.12	−0.66	64.46	1.24	65.69	0.64	66.33	0.53	50043	(Sudan)
South Africa	66.14	62.61	69.60	6.99	66.07	−0.92	65.15	−3.14	62.01	3.44	65.45	0.69	66.14	0.07	63212	(South Africa)
Djibouti	65.99	63.52	68.51	4.99	64.38	−0.18	64.20	−0.37	63.83	1.71	65.54	0.45	65.99	1.61	1153	(Djibouti)
Gambia	65.86	64.17	67.53	3.36	64.43	−0.01	64.42	−0.57	63.85	1.01	64.86	1.00	65.86	1.43	2698	(The Gambia)
Congo, Rep.	65.77	64.12	67.46	3.34	63.15	1.24	64.39	−0.20	64.19	0.81	65.00	0.77	65.77	2.62	6183	(Republic of the Congo)
Ghana	65.50	63.13	67.94	4.81	64.45	−0.15	64.31	−0.02	64.29	0.96	65.25	0.25	65.50	1.04	33788	(Ghana)
Angola	64.62	62.10	67.14	5.04	63.05	0.07	63.12	−0.16	62.96	1.29	64.25	0.37	64.62	1.57	36750	(Angola)
Eswatini	64.12	61.19	66.95	5.77	59.85	0.01	59.86	−1.63	58.23	4.80	63.03	1.09	64.12	4.27	1231	(Eswatini)
Guinea-Bissau	64.08	61.66	66.36	4.71	62.16	−0.82	61.34	0.31	61.65	1.95	63.60	0.48	64.08	1.92	2153	(Guinea-Bissau)
Africa	63.84	61.81	65.91	4.09	62.45	−0.19	62.26	−0.47	61.79	1.13	62.92	0.92	63.84	1.39	1480771	
Equatorial Guinea	63.71	62.04	65.66	3.62	62.30	−0.16	62.14	0.31	62.45	0.91	63.35	0.35	63.71	1.41	1848	(Equatorial Guinea)
Cameroon	63.70	61.52	65.94	4.42	61.70	−0.02	61.67	−0.53	61.15	1.30	62.44	1.26	63.70	2.00	28373	(Cameroon)
Burundi	63.65	61.60	65.70	4.10	62.18	0.39	62.57	−0.47	62.10	0.78	62.88	0.77	63.65	1.47	13689	(Burundi)
Kenya	63.65	61.46	65.92	4.46	62.94	−1.34	61.60	−0.37	61.23	2.32	63.55	0.10	63.65	0.71	55339	(Kenya)
Madagascar	63.63	61.94	65.38	3.44	63.50	−0.80	62.71	−0.19	62.52	0.55	63.07	0.56	63.63	0.13	31196	(Madagascar)
Mozambique	63.61	60.30	66.54	6.24	61.31	0.08	61.39	−1.12	60.27	2.74	63.01	0.60	63.61	2.31	33635	(Mozambique)
Zimbabwe	62.77	60.23	65.01	4.79	61.06	0.47	61.53	−1.40	60.13	2.23	62.36	0.41	62.77	1.72	16341	(Zimbabwe)
Togo	62.74	62.54	62.92	0.39	61.05	0.07	61.12	0.20	61.33	0.96	62.29	0.45	62.74	1.68	9304	(Togo)
Liberia	62.16	60.88	63.44	2.57	61.23	0.04	61.27	−0.10	61.17	0.77	61.93	0.23	62.16	0.93	5493	(Liberia)
Cote d'Ivoire	61.94	60.02	64.13	4.12	60.27	−0.13	60.14	0.15	60.29	1.27	61.56	0.38	61.94	1.67	31166	(Ivory Coast)
DR Congo	61.90	59.79	64.04	4.25	60.24	0.19	60.43	−0.38	60.04	0.94	60.98	0.92	61.90	1.65	105790	(Democratic Republic of the Congo)
Sierra Leone	61.79	60.06	63.50	3.44	59.59	0.10	59.69	0.57	60.26	1.01	61.27	0.51	61.79	2.19	8461	(Sierra Leone)
Niger	61.18	60.26	62.13	1.87	60.03	−0.14	59.89	−0.35	59.54	0.86	60.40	0.79	61.18	1.15	26160	(Niger)
Burkina Faso	61.09	58.92	63.22	4.30	60.18	0.27	60.45	−0.41	60.05	0.65	60.70	0.39	61.09	0.91	23026	(Burkina Faso)
Benin	60.77	59.35	62.21	2.86	59.89	0.27	60.15	−0.54	59.61	0.86	60.48	0.30	60.77	0.89	14111	(Benin)
Guinea	60.74	59.52	61.90	2.38	59.38	−0.03	59.35	0.02	59.37	1.06	60.43	0.31	60.74	1.36	14405	(Guinea)
Mali	60.44	59.04	61.90	2.86	59.22	−0.36	58.86	0.26	59.12	0.92	60.03	0.40	60.44	1.22	23769	(Mali)
Somalia	58.82	56.35	61.39	5.04	57.25	−0.15	57.09	−1.39	55.70	−1.77	53.93	4.88	58.82	1.57	18359	(Somalia)
South Sudan	57.62	54.64	60.63	5.99	58.13	−0.48	57.65	−0.60	57.05	0.16	57.20	0.41	57.62	−0.51	11483	(South Sudan)
CAR	57.41	55.26	59.29	4.03	31.53	19.07	50.60	−10.32	40.28	−21.46	18.82	38.59	57.41	25.88	5152	(Central African Republic)
Lesotho	57.38	54.62	60.01	5.39	55.25	−0.12	55.13	−0.92	54.21	2.60	56.81	0.56	57.38	2.13	2311	(Lesotho)
Chad	55.07	53.20	57.01	3.82	52.99	0.09	53.08	0.05	53.14	1.39	54.53	0.54	55.07	2.08	19319	(Chad)
Nigeria	54.46	54.18	54.74	0.57	53.01	0.06	53.07	0.38	53.45	0.62	54.08	0.38	54.46	1.45	227883	(Nigeria)

== World Bank Group (2024) ==
Estimation of the World Bank Group for 2024. The data is filtered according to the list of countries in Africa. The values in the World Bank Group tables are rounded. All calculations are based on raw data, so due to the nuances of rounding, in some places illusory inconsistencies of indicators arose, with a size of 0.01 year.

World Bank Group (2024)
Countries and territories	2024				Historical data													recovery from COVID-19: 2019→2024	
Countries and territories	All	Male	Female	Sex gap	2014	2014 →2019	2019	2019 →2020	2020	2020 →2021	2021	2021 →2022	2022	2022 →2023	2023	2023 →2024	2024	recovery from COVID-19: 2019→2024	
Tunisia	76.71	74.13	79.33	5.20	74.78	0.81	75.60	−0.59	75.00	−2.11	72.89	3.16	76.05	0.46	76.51	0.20	76.71	1.11	(Tunisia)
Algeria	76.47	75.10	77.91	2.82	74.99	0.69	75.68	−2.42	73.26	1.95	75.21	0.92	76.13	0.13	76.26	0.21	76.47	0.79	(Algeria)
Seychelles	76.30	72.10	80.70	8.60	73.23	0.82	74.05	3.19	77.24	−3.84	73.40	1.11	74.51	0.91	75.42	0.88	76.30	2.25	(Seychelles)
Cabo Verde	76.22	73.05	79.37	6.32	73.79	1.66	75.45	−1.63	73.82	0.61	74.42	1.48	75.91	0.15	76.06	0.17	76.22	0.78	(Cape Verde)
Morocco	75.49	73.35	77.78	4.43	72.52	1.72	74.25	−1.11	73.13	0.25	73.39	1.78	75.16	0.15	75.31	0.18	75.49	1.25	(Morocco)
Mauritius	73.79	70.35	77.40	7.05	74.19	0.04	74.24	−0.06	74.18	−0.50	73.68	−0.17	73.51	−0.10	73.41	0.38	73.79	−0.45	(Mauritius)
World	73.48	71.11	75.97	4.86	71.78	1.09	72.87	−0.69	72.18	−0.97	71.21	1.75	72.97	0.36	73.33	0.15	73.48	0.61	
Egypt	71.81	69.65	74.01	4.36	69.91	1.30	71.21	−1.42	69.79	−0.81	68.98	2.03	71.01	0.62	71.63	0.17	71.81	0.59	(Egypt)
Libya	71.12	69.62	72.68	3.05	71.30	1.64	72.94	−0.55	72.39	−0.33	72.06	2.40	74.46	−5.12	69.34	1.78	71.12	−1.82	(Libya)
Sao Tome and Principe	69.91	66.41	73.91	7.50	65.48	2.57	68.04	−0.06	67.98	0.05	68.03	1.21	69.24	0.48	69.72	0.19	69.91	1.86	(São Tomé and Príncipe)
Botswana	69.29	66.78	71.85	5.07	62.17	5.00	67.17	0.48	67.64	−4.34	63.30	5.45	68.75	0.41	69.16	0.13	69.29	2.13	(Botswana)
Senegal	68.92	67.01	71.01	4.01	66.00	1.67	67.67	−0.17	67.50	−0.63	66.87	0.92	67.79	0.90	68.68	0.24	68.92	1.26	(Senegal)
Eritrea	68.89	66.76	70.94	4.19	65.52	1.79	67.31	−0.33	66.98	−0.04	66.94	0.85	67.79	0.83	68.62	0.27	68.89	1.59	(Eritrea)
Mauritania	68.71	66.70	70.73	4.03	66.21	1.43	67.64	−0.85	66.79	−0.03	66.76	1.52	68.28	0.20	68.48	0.23	68.71	1.07	(Mauritania)
Gabon	68.51	66.06	71.24	5.18	66.07	1.27	67.34	−0.26	67.07	0.00	67.07	0.64	67.71	0.62	68.34	0.17	68.51	1.17	(Gabon)
Uganda	68.49	65.49	71.36	5.88	63.06	3.30	66.35	0.06	66.41	0.04	66.45	1.22	67.67	0.58	68.25	0.23	68.49	2.13	(Uganda)
Rwanda	68.02	65.71	70.14	4.43	65.09	1.60	66.69	0.26	66.95	−0.10	66.85	0.68	67.53	0.26	67.78	0.23	68.02	1.33	(Rwanda)
Ethiopia	67.60	64.36	71.02	6.67	62.93	2.81	65.74	0.23	65.97	−0.64	65.33	1.57	66.90	0.42	67.31	0.29	67.60	1.86	(Ethiopia)
Malawi	67.56	64.27	70.77	6.50	61.65	3.34	65.00	0.22	65.22	−0.43	64.78	1.26	66.04	1.32	67.35	0.21	67.56	2.57	(Malawi)
Namibia	67.52	63.45	71.48	8.02	59.31	4.23	63.55	0.52	64.07	−3.22	60.85	3.34	64.19	3.20	67.39	0.13	67.52	3.97	(Namibia)
Tanzania	67.21	64.40	70.00	5.60	63.36	2.64	66.01	0.76	66.77	−0.64	66.13	0.75	66.88	0.12	67.00	0.22	67.21	1.20	(Tanzania)
Comoros	67.02	65.02	69.20	4.18	64.14	1.52	65.66	0.09	65.76	−0.56	65.20	1.28	66.48	0.30	66.78	0.25	67.02	1.36	(Comoros)
Zambia	66.53	64.10	68.87	4.77	60.11	2.80	62.91	0.45	63.36	−1.00	62.36	2.92	65.28	1.07	66.35	0.18	66.53	3.61	(Zambia)
Sudan	66.52	63.45	69.83	6.38	63.99	1.81	65.80	−0.68	65.12	−0.66	64.46	1.23	65.69	0.64	66.33	0.19	66.52	0.72	(Sudan)
South Africa	66.31	62.78	69.79	7.01	63.18	2.89	66.07	−0.92	65.15	−3.14	62.01	3.44	65.45	0.69	66.14	0.17	66.31	0.24	(South Africa)
Djibouti	66.20	63.73	68.74	5.02	62.43	1.95	64.38	−0.18	64.20	−0.37	63.83	1.71	65.54	0.45	65.99	0.22	66.20	1.82	(Djibouti)
Gambia	66.06	64.35	67.75	3.40	62.58	1.85	64.43	−0.01	64.42	−0.57	63.85	1.01	64.86	1.00	65.86	0.20	66.06	1.63	(The Gambia)
Congo, Rep.	66.00	64.33	67.72	3.39	63.35	−0.20	63.15	1.24	64.39	−0.20	64.19	0.81	65.00	0.77	65.77	0.23	66.00	2.85	(Republic of the Congo)
Ghana	65.69	63.31	68.16	4.85	62.83	1.62	64.45	−0.15	64.31	−0.02	64.29	0.96	65.25	0.25	65.50	0.20	65.69	1.24	(Ghana)
Angola	64.81	62.27	67.34	5.07	60.40	2.66	63.05	0.06	63.12	−0.16	62.96	1.29	64.25	0.37	64.62	0.19	64.81	1.75	(Angola)
Eswatini	64.26	61.32	67.11	5.79	53.49	6.36	59.85	0.01	59.86	−1.63	58.23	4.80	63.03	1.10	64.12	0.14	64.26	4.41	(Eswatini)
Guinea-Bissau	64.25	61.82	66.55	4.73	59.48	2.69	62.16	−0.82	61.34	0.31	61.65	1.95	63.60	0.48	64.08	0.17	64.25	2.09	(Guinea-Bissau)
Cameroon	63.97	61.78	66.22	4.45	59.13	2.56	61.70	−0.02	61.67	−0.53	61.15	1.30	62.44	1.26	63.70	0.27	63.97	2.27	(Cameroon)
Equatorial Guinea	63.91	62.22	65.89	3.66	60.23	2.07	62.30	−0.16	62.14	0.31	62.45	0.91	63.35	0.35	63.71	0.20	63.91	1.61	(Equatorial Guinea)
Madagascar	63.84	62.12	65.60	3.48	63.26	0.24	63.50	−0.80	62.71	−0.19	62.52	0.55	63.07	0.56	63.63	0.20	63.84	0.33	(Madagascar)
Kenya	63.83	61.64	66.12	4.48	61.99	0.95	62.94	−1.34	61.60	−0.37	61.23	2.32	63.55	0.10	63.65	0.19	63.83	0.90	(Kenya)
Burundi	63.82	61.75	65.88	4.13	59.76	2.42	62.18	0.39	62.57	−0.47	62.10	0.78	62.88	0.77	63.65	0.17	63.82	1.64	(Burundi)
Mozambique	63.80	60.49	66.74	6.26	57.97	3.34	61.31	0.08	61.39	−1.12	60.27	2.74	63.01	0.60	63.61	0.19	63.80	2.49	(Mozambique)
Zimbabwe	63.06	60.49	65.31	4.82	58.11	2.95	61.06	0.47	61.53	−1.40	60.13	2.23	62.36	0.41	62.77	0.29	63.06	2.00	(Zimbabwe)
Togo	62.94	62.70	63.15	0.46	58.78	2.28	61.06	0.08	61.14	0.20	61.34	0.95	62.29	0.45	62.74	0.20	62.94	1.87	(Togo)
Liberia	62.32	61.02	63.63	2.61	59.21	2.02	61.23	0.04	61.27	−0.10	61.17	0.77	61.93	0.23	62.16	0.16	62.32	1.09	(Liberia)
Cote d'Ivoire	62.11	60.17	64.31	4.14	57.77	2.50	60.27	−0.13	60.14	0.15	60.29	1.27	61.56	0.38	61.94	0.17	62.11	1.84	(Ivory Coast)
DR Congo	62.07	59.96	64.23	4.27	58.24	2.01	60.24	0.19	60.43	−0.38	60.04	0.94	60.98	0.92	61.90	0.18	62.07	1.83	(Democratic Republic of the Congo)
Sierra Leone	61.96	60.23	63.70	3.47	54.28	5.31	59.59	0.10	59.69	0.57	60.26	1.02	61.27	0.51	61.79	0.18	61.96	2.37	(Sierra Leone)
Niger	61.43	60.49	62.41	1.92	58.69	1.34	60.03	−0.14	59.89	−0.35	59.54	0.86	60.40	0.78	61.18	0.25	61.43	1.40	(Niger)
Burkina Faso	61.29	59.11	63.43	4.32	58.33	1.85	60.18	0.27	60.45	−0.41	60.05	0.65	60.70	0.39	61.09	0.20	61.29	1.11	(Burkina Faso)
Benin	60.96	59.52	62.42	2.90	59.01	0.88	59.89	0.27	60.15	−0.54	59.61	0.87	60.48	0.30	60.77	0.19	60.96	1.07	(Benin)
Guinea	60.90	59.66	62.09	2.43	57.58	1.80	59.38	−0.03	59.35	0.02	59.37	1.06	60.43	0.31	60.74	0.16	60.90	1.53	(Guinea)
Mali	60.67	59.25	62.15	2.90	57.48	1.73	59.22	−0.36	58.86	0.26	59.12	0.92	60.03	0.40	60.44	0.24	60.67	1.46	(Mali)
Somalia	58.97	56.49	61.55	5.06	54.44	2.81	57.25	−0.15	57.09	−1.39	55.70	−1.77	53.93	4.89	58.82	0.15	58.97	1.72	(Somalia)
Lesotho	57.80	55.03	60.44	5.41	50.79	4.46	55.25	−0.12	55.13	−0.92	54.21	2.60	56.81	0.56	57.38	0.42	57.80	2.55	(Lesotho)
South Sudan	57.74	54.76	60.75	5.99	45.62	12.50	58.13	−0.48	57.65	−0.60	57.05	0.16	57.20	0.41	57.62	0.12	57.74	−0.39	(South Sudan)
Central African Republic	57.67	55.51	59.56	4.05	40.27	−8.73	31.53	19.07	50.60	−10.32	40.28	−21.46	18.82	38.59	57.41	0.26	57.67	26.14	(Central African Republic)
Chad	55.24	53.36	57.19	3.83	51.14	1.85	52.99	0.09	53.08	0.05	53.14	1.39	54.53	0.54	55.07	0.17	55.24	2.24	(Chad)
Nigeria	54.63	54.33	54.94	0.61	51.94	1.07	53.01	0.06	53.07	0.38	53.45	0.62	54.08	0.38	54.46	0.17	54.63	1.63	(Nigeria)

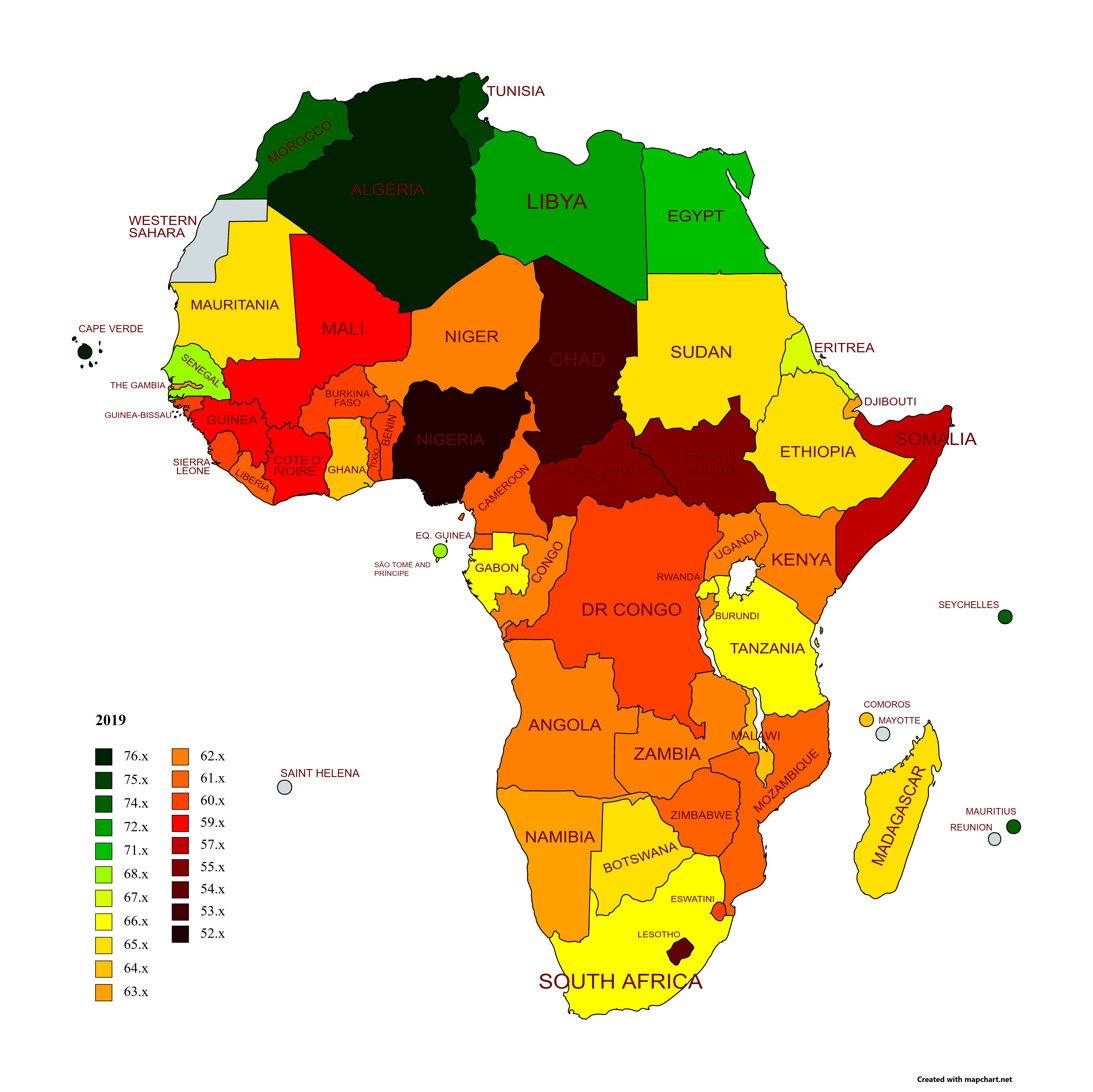
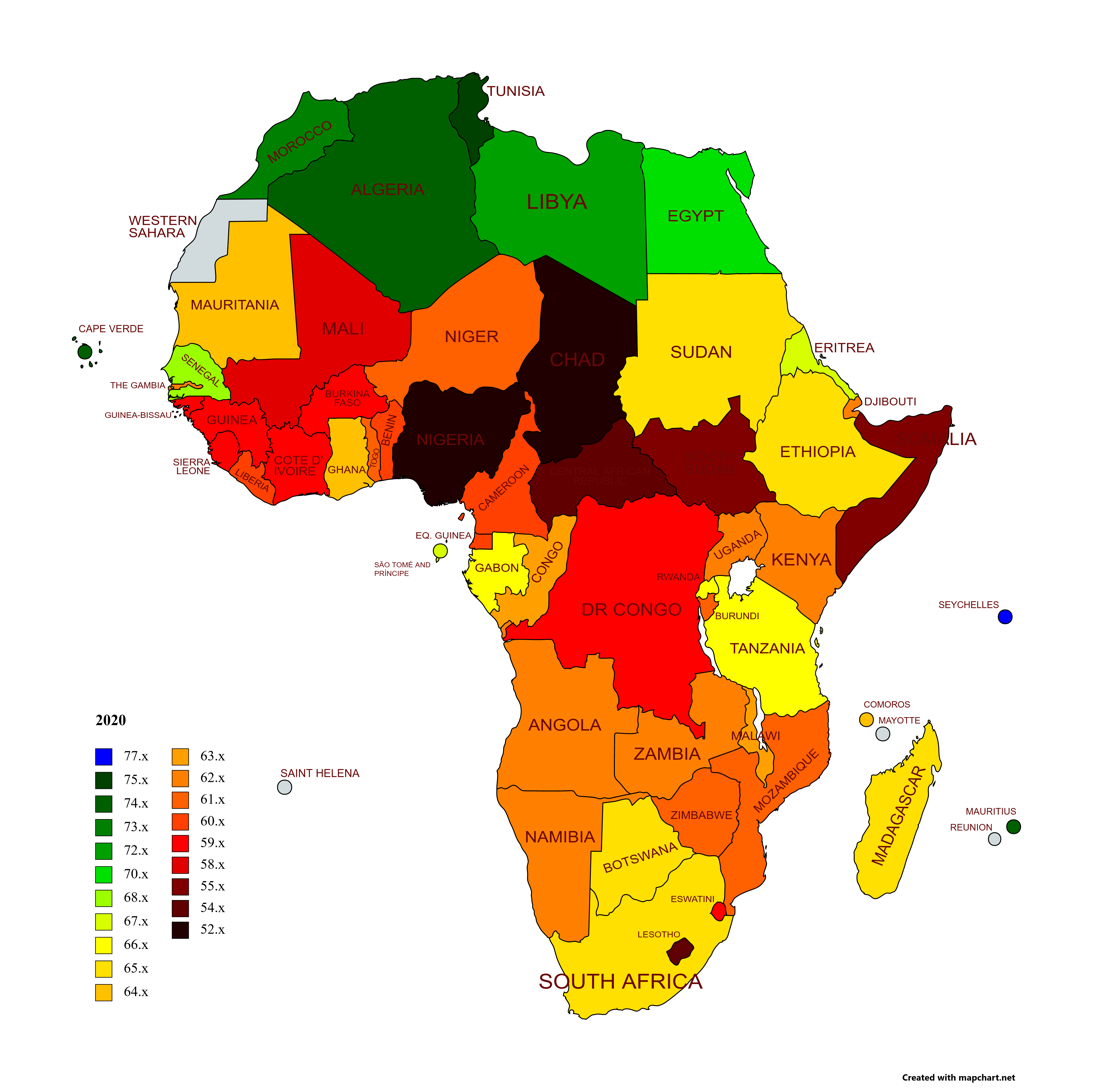
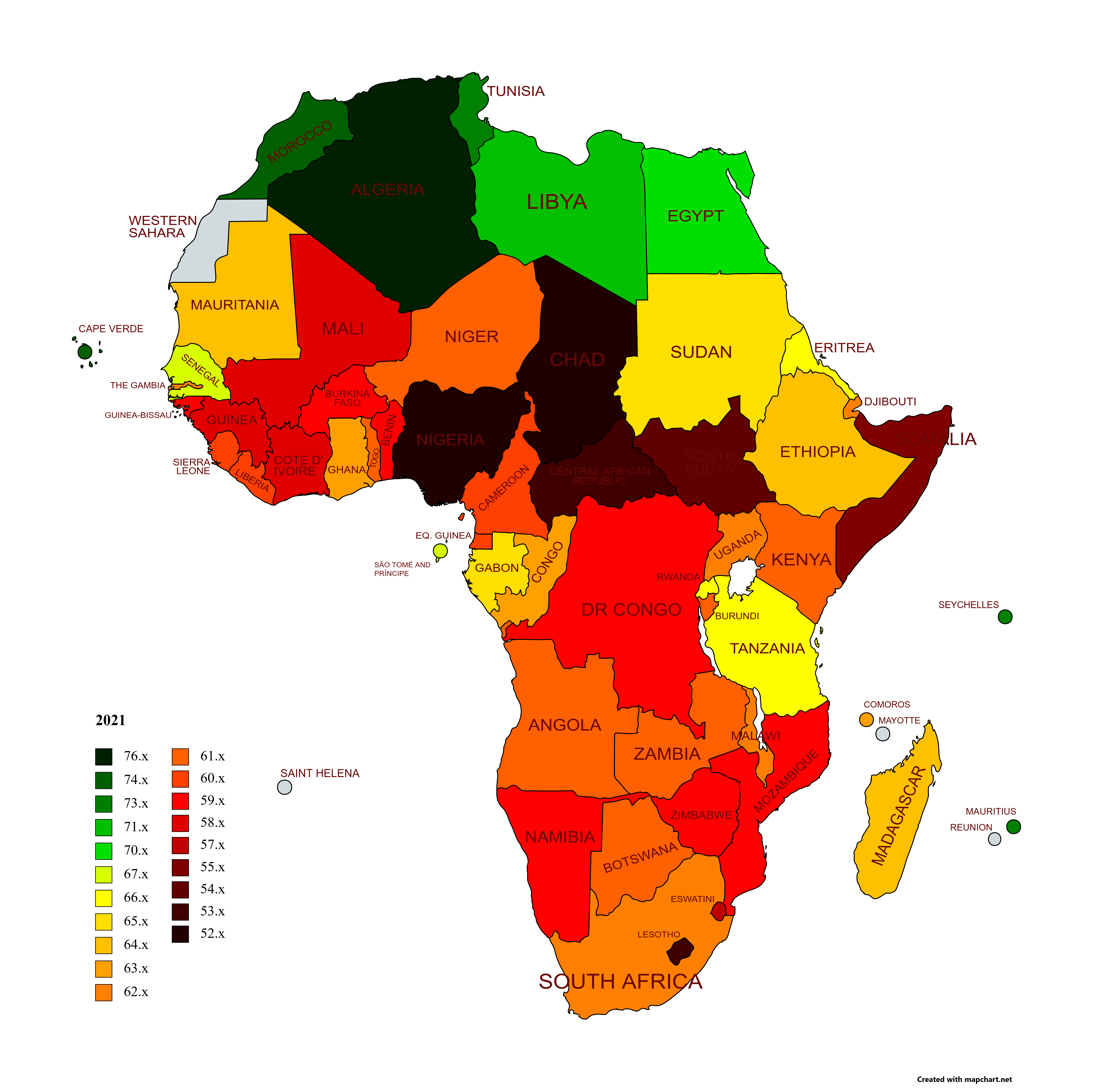
Change in life expectancy in Africa from 2019 to 2021

== WHO (2019) ==
Estimation of the World Health Organization for 2019.

World Health Organization (2019)
Countries	Life expectancy at birth					HALE at birth					Life expectancy at age 60					HALE at age 60					
Countries	All	M	F	FΔM	Δ 2000	All	M	F	FΔM	Δ 2000	All	M	F	FΔM	Δ 2000	All	M	F	FΔM	Δ 2000	
Tunisia	77.51	75.09	79.99	4.90	3.21	66.68	66.03	67.38	1.35	2.33	21.74	20.14	23.33	3.19	1.47	16.19	15.26	17.12	1.86	0.89	(Tunisia)
Algeria	76.55	76.24	77.08	0.84	4.08	66.14	67.04	65.34	−1.70	3.20	21.43	21.62	21.47	−0.15	1.39	16.09	16.45	15.89	−0.56	0.82	(Algeria)
Cape Verde	74.06	69.71	78.23	8.52	2.36	64.76	62.30	67.06	4.76	2.32	19.59	16.54	21.95	5.41	−1.09	14.91	12.93	16.44	3.51	−0.90	(Cape Verde)
Mauritius	74.06	70.83	77.43	6.60	2.92	64.25	62.46	66.12	3.66	2.06	20.40	18.56	22.09	3.53	2.59	15.08	13.99	16.08	2.09	1.65	(Mauritius)
Morocco	73.75	72.85	74.64	1.79	3.56	63.60	64.13	63.04	−1.09	2.91	18.97	18.32	19.59	1.27	−0.09	14.15	13.92	14.36	0.44	−0.32	(Morocco)
Libya	73.54	71.47	75.70	4.23	−0.50	63.36	62.73	63.99	1.26	−0.87	19.90	19.10	20.63	1.53	−1.02	14.76	14.36	15.13	0.77	−1.08	(Libya)
Seychelles	73.12	70.08	76.65	6.57	1.01	64.31	62.52	66.37	3.85	0.62	19.38	17.51	21.23	3.72	0.19	14.54	13.34	15.75	2.41	−0.12	(Seychelles)
World	73.12	70.61	75.70	5.09	6.35	63.45	62.33	64.59	2.26	5.33	21.03	19.41	22.54	3.13	2.16	15.80	14.87	16.67	1.80	1.52	
Sao Tome and Principe	71.66	70.16	73.18	3.02	8.53	62.95	62.80	63.09	0.29	7.43	17.77	16.82	18.69	1.87	0.83	13.62	13.21	14.02	0.81	0.58	(São Tomé and Príncipe)
Egypt	71.59	68.97	74.30	5.33	2.44	62.52	61.66	63.40	1.74	2.10	17.18	15.30	18.94	3.64	−0.66	13.02	11.93	14.05	2.12	−0.65	(Egypt)
Mauritania	70.18	70.00	70.38	0.38	7.26	61.59	62.49	60.82	−1.67	6.38	18.63	18.89	18.39	−0.50	1.61	14.45	14.95	14.01	−0.94	1.27	(Mauritania)
Sudan	69.47	68.35	70.55	2.20	6.98	60.11	60.26	59.98	−0.28	5.98	19.04	18.65	19.39	0.74	1.68	14.42	14.32	14.52	0.20	1.20	(Sudan)
Ethiopia	68.85	67.17	70.54	3.37	18.06	59.93	59.20	60.67	1.47	15.48	18.67	17.89	19.39	1.50	5.23	14.05	13.67	14.40	0.73	3.94	(Ethiopia)
Senegal	68.76	67.08	70.28	3.20	10.15	59.87	59.62	60.11	0.49	8.92	17.90	17.08	18.55	1.47	1.34	13.54	13.23	13.78	0.55	0.99	(Senegal)
Comoros	68.10	66.80	69.43	2.63	6.06	59.76	59.44	60.07	0.63	5.47	18.05	17.58	18.49	0.91	1.96	13.82	13.64	13.99	0.35	1.48	(Comoros)
Rwanda	67.76	65.65	69.62	3.97	20.87	59.10	58.15	59.93	1.78	18.34	17.82	16.50	18.83	2.33	5.14	13.66	12.87	14.27	1.40	3.96	(Rwanda)
Tanzania	66.79	65.20	68.37	3.17	14.00	58.31	57.97	58.68	0.71	12.39	18.05	17.23	18.79	1.56	2.62	13.80	13.44	14.12	0.68	2.02	(Tanzania)
Kenya	66.50	64.07	68.99	4.92	12.41	58.25	57.12	59.40	2.28	11.10	17.37	15.81	18.80	2.99	0.66	13.16	12.24	13.99	1.75	0.72	(Kenya)
Uganda	66.09	62.82	69.31	6.49	17.20	57.55	55.58	59.50	3.92	15.06	17.70	15.57	19.52	3.95	3.77	13.46	11.99	14.71	2.72	2.90	(Uganda)
Ghana	65.97	63.47	68.59	5.12	6.88	57.94	56.84	59.12	2.28	6.21	16.99	15.45	18.52	3.07	1.16	13.11	12.14	14.07	1.93	0.94	(Ghana)
South Africa	65.84	62.50	68.85	6.35	8.72	56.29	54.65	57.73	3.08	6.89	18.71	16.78	19.92	3.14	1.70	13.77	12.67	14.46	1.79	1.02	(South Africa)
Djibouti	65.44	63.63	67.27	3.64	5.92	57.61	56.90	58.34	1.44	5.24	17.45	16.30	18.54	2.24	1.48	13.44	12.77	14.08	1.31	1.13	(Djibouti)
Gabon	64.97	62.61	67.75	5.14	7.28	56.38	55.38	57.56	2.18	6.34	16.24	14.72	17.96	3.24	1.73	12.21	11.20	13.34	2.14	1.24	(Gabon)
Botswana	64.92	62.74	66.95	4.21	17.76	56.05	55.04	56.96	1.92	14.74	17.93	16.14	19.42	3.28	3.85	13.38	12.20	14.36	2.16	2.73	(Botswana)
Gambia	64.91	62.91	66.98	4.07	5.76	56.60	56.31	56.93	0.62	5.09	16.45	15.48	17.44	1.96	0.39	12.53	12.19	12.87	0.68	0.28	(The Gambia)
Burundi	64.32	62.37	66.23	3.86	19.96	56.21	55.10	57.29	2.19	17.41	16.51	15.46	17.42	1.96	3.78	12.78	12.16	13.30	1.14	2.99	(Burundi)
Africa	64.17	62.26	66.08	3.82	11.19	55.81	55.14	56.49	1.35	9.83	17.57	16.58	18.44	1.86	2.22	13.29	12.79	13.73	0.94	1.71	
Benin	64.14	61.76	66.58	4.82	6.72	55.87	54.94	56.83	1.89	5.98	17.78	16.47	18.98	2.51	1.55	13.46	12.77	14.11	1.34	1.18	(Benin)
Madagascar	63.82	62.83	64.82	1.99	5.09	56.16	56.09	56.23	0.14	4.83	16.25	15.90	16.57	0.67	1.29	12.56	12.48	12.64	0.16	1.08	(Madagascar)
Eritrea	63.76	61.00	66.53	5.53	8.83	55.67	53.75	57.59	3.84	7.98	15.09	13.87	16.18	2.31	1.87	11.49	10.65	12.23	1.58	1.37	(Eritrea)
Togo	63.65	61.21	66.34	5.13	7.57	55.81	54.83	56.91	2.08	6.79	16.38	15.00	17.84	2.84	1.11	12.64	11.84	13.48	1.64	0.93	(Togo)
Namibia	63.49	59.99	66.90	6.91	10.47	55.53	53.34	57.66	4.32	8.81	16.47	14.24	18.26	4.02	2.40	12.59	11.05	13.82	2.77	1.71	(Namibia)
Cote d'Ivoire	63.48	61.19	66.19	5.00	12.31	55.42	54.42	56.64	2.22	10.90	17.07	15.86	18.55	2.69	2.48	13.00	12.30	13.85	1.55	2.01	(Ivory Coast)
Liberia	63.44	62.68	64.20	1.52	10.17	53.99	54.54	53.47	−1.07	8.88	17.05	16.96	17.11	0.15	1.60	12.57	12.83	12.36	−0.47	1.15	(Liberia)
Malawi	63.23	60.43	66.05	5.62	18.59	55.54	54.20	56.91	2.71	16.53	15.90	14.19	17.44	3.25	2.82	12.24	11.21	13.17	1.96	2.25	(Malawi)
Nigeria	63.07	61.68	64.51	2.83	9.01	54.81	54.68	54.95	0.27	8.18	18.61	18.00	19.21	1.21	2.39	14.10	13.94	14.25	0.31	1.94	(Nigeria)
Congo Republic	62.76	62.43	63.08	0.65	10.54	54.67	55.30	54.06	−1.24	9.14	15.56	15.31	15.79	0.48	2.48	11.80	11.79	11.82	0.03	1.84	(Republic of the Congo)
Burkina Faso	62.61	60.08	65.06	4.98	10.72	54.96	53.78	56.09	2.31	9.90	16.77	15.33	17.92	2.59	1.49	12.93	12.04	13.64	1.60	1.31	(Burkina Faso)
Angola	62.49	60.33	64.65	4.32	13.12	54.32	53.24	55.40	2.16	11.47	16.35	14.90	17.69	2.79	2.31	12.31	11.34	13.21	1.87	1.70	(Angola)
Cameroon	62.03	60.08	64.06	3.98	9.07	54.24	53.56	54.96	1.40	8.11	16.80	15.66	17.89	2.23	2.01	12.77	12.19	13.33	1.14	1.60	(Cameroon)
Congo DR	61.84	59.67	64.08	4.41	9.20	53.50	52.46	54.59	2.13	8.47	15.99	14.89	17.04	2.15	1.52	11.99	11.28	12.67	1.39	1.25	(Democratic Republic of the Congo)
Mali	61.83	61.28	62.41	1.13	8.77	53.81	54.23	53.40	−0.83	7.75	17.18	17.15	17.20	0.05	1.34	13.00	13.22	12.82	−0.40	1.01	(Mali)
Zambia	61.76	59.43	63.95	4.52	17.23	53.87	52.67	54.97	2.30	14.98	16.00	14.43	17.22	2.79	3.30	12.20	11.17	13.00	1.83	2.48	(Zambia)
Equatorial Guinea	61.39	59.88	63.05	3.17	7.36	53.17	52.76	53.51	0.75	6.57	16.92	15.62	18.23	2.61	1.95	12.58	11.78	13.37	1.59	1.44	(Equatorial Guinea)
Guinea	61.13	59.80	62.36	2.56	6.93	53.51	53.36	53.67	0.31	6.08	16.58	16.02	17.01	0.99	1.09	12.71	12.57	12.81	0.24	0.84	(Guinea)
Niger	60.57	59.64	61.52	1.88	10.33	53.15	53.31	52.99	−0.32	9.29	17.24	16.85	17.58	0.73	1.43	13.21	13.23	13.21	−0.02	1.15	(Niger)
Sierra Leone	60.40	59.50	61.30	1.80	10.61	52.63	52.68	52.58	−0.10	9.56	16.62	16.32	16.87	0.55	1.45	12.62	12.64	12.61	−0.03	1.15	(Sierra Leone)
Chad	59.37	57.84	60.94	3.10	8.20	51.78	51.37	52.20	0.83	7.22	16.05	15.34	16.71	1.37	1.41	12.18	11.90	12.44	0.54	1.11	(Chad)
Zimbabwe	59.07	56.90	61.02	4.12	13.32	51.95	50.90	52.93	2.03	11.42	14.31	13.12	15.27	2.15	0.71	10.98	10.21	11.58	1.37	0.48	(Zimbabwe)
South Sudan	59.00	56.78	61.16	4.38	7.10	50.96	49.90	52.00	2.10	6.35	15.60	14.35	16.65	2.30	0.37	11.47	10.85	11.99	1.14	0.30	(South Sudan)
Guinea-Bissau	58.98	56.41	61.44	5.03	8.78	51.81	50.60	52.96	2.36	7.86	14.57	13.43	15.47	2.04	1.60	11.17	10.55	11.65	1.10	1.23	(Guinea-Bissau)
Mozambique	58.51	55.39	61.67	6.28	7.56	50.65	49.27	52.06	2.79	7.10	15.15	12.92	17.06	4.14	0.47	11.41	9.96	12.64	2.68	0.59	(Mozambique)
Eswatini	55.75	52.47	59.38	6.91	8.97	48.65	46.64	50.88	4.24	7.23	14.22	11.96	16.13	4.17	1.59	10.69	9.11	12.02	2.91	0.94	(Eswatini)
Somalia	55.21	52.87	57.75	4.88	5.93	48.65	47.28	50.14	2.86	5.24	13.52	12.42	14.59	2.17	1.17	10.41	9.72	11.08	1.36	0.88	(Somalia)
Central African Republic	52.93	50.31	55.89	5.58	8.70	45.97	44.41	47.75	3.34	7.67	12.61	11.19	14.27	3.08	1.48	9.42	8.44	10.56	2.12	1.15	(Central African Republic)
Lesotho	51.78	48.96	54.91	5.95	4.40	45.04	43.39	46.88	3.49	3.22	12.71	10.80	14.33	3.53	−0.41	9.52	8.24	10.59	2.35	−0.61	(Lesotho)

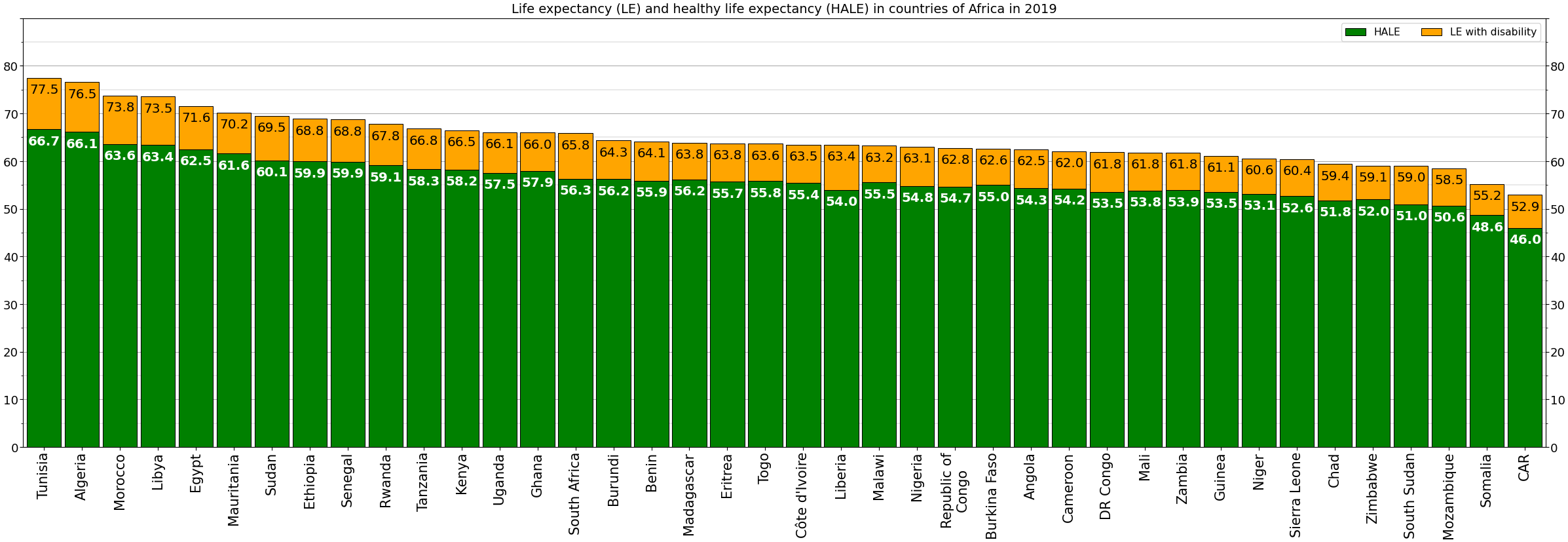
Life expectancy and HALE in countries of Africa in 2019

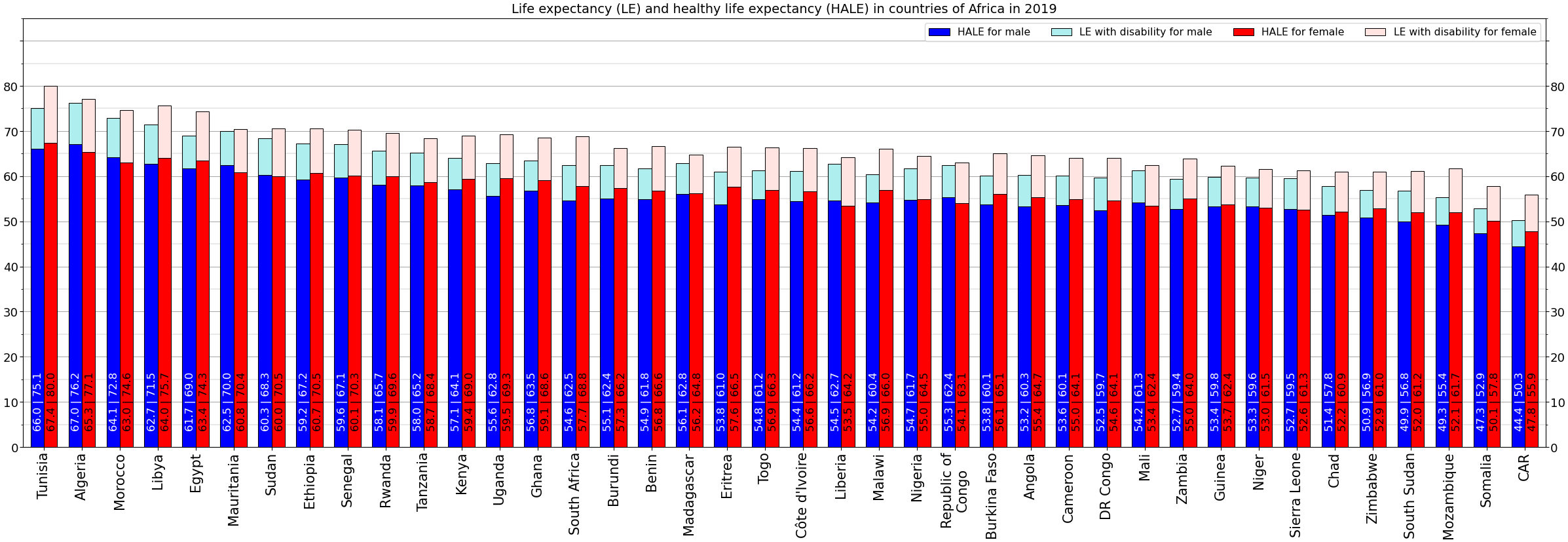
Elaboration by sex

Interactive chart of male and female life expectancy in Africa as defined by WHO for 2019. Open the original chart and hover over chart elements. The squares of bubbles are proportional to population according to estimation of the UN for 2019.

== Charts ==
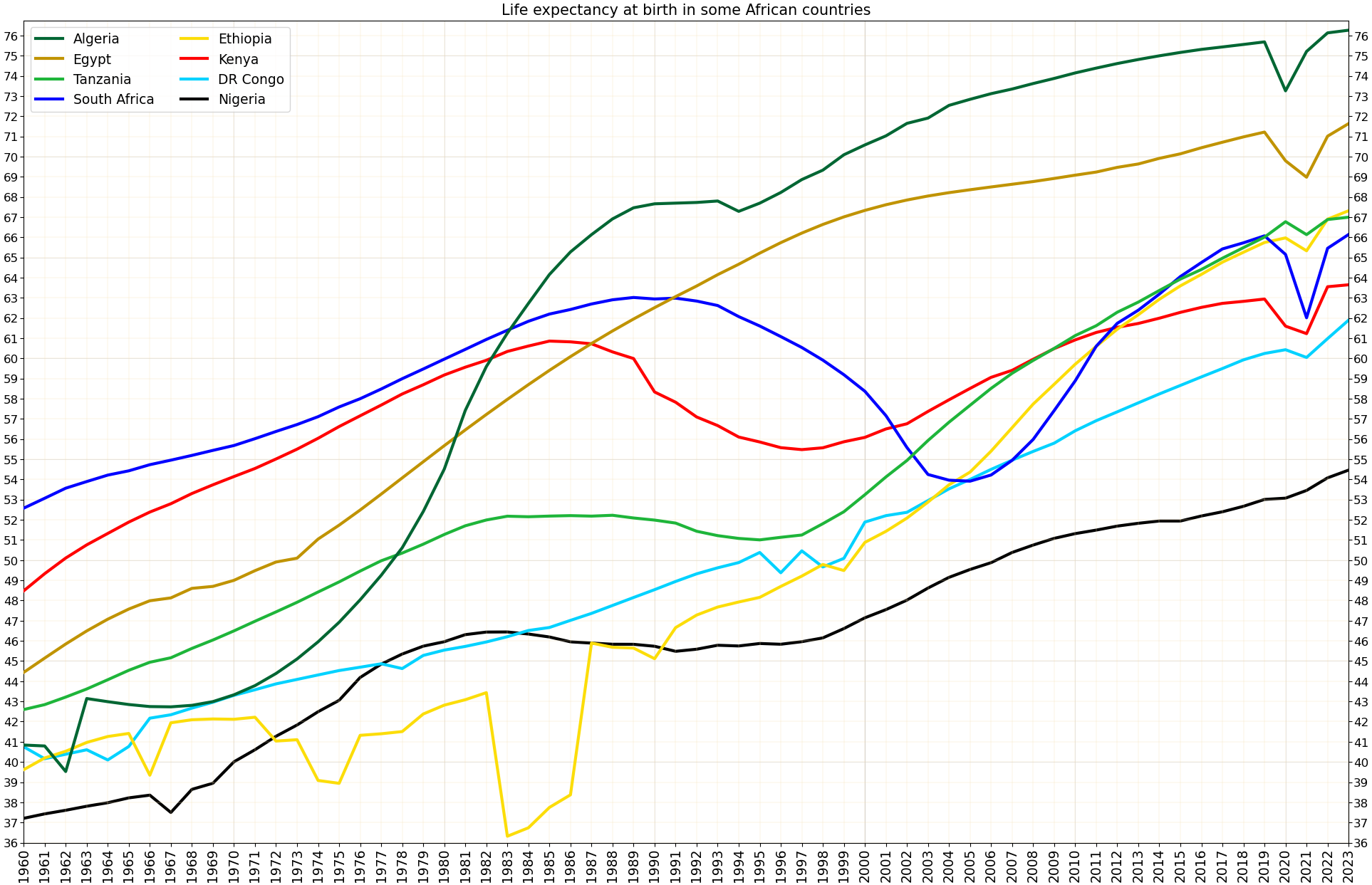
Life expectancy in some African countries

== See also ==
- List of countries by life expectancy
- List of African regions by life expectancy
- List of South African provinces by life expectancy
- List of oldest people
- Longevity
- Life extension
