= India =

Country in South Asia

Republic of India Bhārat Gaṇarājya
- Flag State emblem
- Motto: Satyameva Jayate (Sanskrit) "Truth Alone Triumphs"
- Anthem: "Jana Gana Mana" (Hindi) (Note: Originally written in Sanskritised Bengali and adopted as the national anthem in its Devanagari transliteration.) "Thou Art the Ruler of the Minds of All People"
- National song: "Vande Mataram" (Sanskrit) (Note: Written in a mixture of Sanskrit and Sanskritised Bengali.) "I Bow to Thee, Mother" (Note: "[...] Jana Gana Mana is the National Anthem of India, subject to such alterations in the words as the Government may authorise as occasion arises; and the song Vande Mataram, which has played a historic part in the struggle for Indian freedom, shall be honoured equally with Jana Gana Mana and shall have equal status with it.")
- Territory controlled by India Territory claimed but not controlled
- Capital: New Delhi; 28°36′50″N 77°12′30″E
- Largest city by city proper population: Mumbai
- Largest city by metropolitan area population: Delhi
- Official languages: Hindi; English (Note: According to Part XVII of the Constitution of India, Hindi in the Devanagari script is the official language of the Union, along with English as an additional official language. States and union territories can have a different official language of their own other than Hindi or English.)
- Recognised regional languages: State level and Eighth Schedule: Eighth Schedule; Assamese; Bengali; Boro; Dogri; Gujarati; Hindi; Kannada; Kashmiri; Konkani; Maithili; Malayalam; Manipuri; Marathi; Nepali; Odia; Punjabi; Sanskrit; Santali; Sindhi; Tamil; Telugu; Urdu; State level (Note: Not all the state-level official languages are in the Eighth Schedule, and not all the scheduled languages are state-level official languages. For example, the Sindhi language is an 8th scheduled language but not a state-level official language.); Bhujel; Garo; Khasi; Kokborok; Lepcha; Limbu; Magar; Mizo; Newar; Rai; Sherpa; Sikkimese; Sunuwar; Tamang; all the 8th scheduled languages – except Sindhi, Kashmiri and Dogri (Note: Kashmiri and Dogri language are the official languages of Jammu and Kashmir which is currently a union territory and no longer the former state.)
- Native languages: 424 languages (Note: According to Ethnologue, there are 426 living indigenous languages in India, in contrast to 11 extinct indigenous languages. In addition, there are 32 living non-indigenous languages.; Different sources give widely differing figures, primarily based on how the terms "language" and "dialect" are defined and grouped.)
- Religion (2011): 79.8% Hinduism; 14.2% Islam; 2.3% Christianity; 1.7% Sikhism; 0.7% Buddhism; 0.4% Jainism; 0.23% unaffiliated; 0.65% other
- Demonyms: Indian; others
- Government: Federal parliamentary republic
  - President: Droupadi Murmu
  - Vice President: C. P. Radhakrishnan
  - Prime Minister: Narendra Modi
- Legislature: Parliament
  - Upper house: Rajya Sabha
  - Lower house: Lok Sabha

Independence from the United Kingdom
  - Dominion: 15 August 1947
  - Republic: 26 January 1950

Area
  - Total: 3,287,263 km^{2} (1,269,219 sq mi) (Note: "The country's exact size is subject to debate because some borders are disputed. The Indian government lists the total area as 3,287,260 km^{2} (1,269,220 sq mi) and the total land area as 3,060,500 km^{2} (1,181,700 sq mi); the United Nations lists the total area as 3,287,263 km^{2} (1,269,219 sq mi) and total land area as 2,973,190 km^{2} (1,147,960 sq mi).") (7th)
  - Water (%): 9.6

Population
  - 2026 estimate: ▲1.48 billion (1st)
  - 2011 census: ▲1,210,854,977 (2nd)
  - Density: 436.7/km^{2} (1,131.0/sq mi) (30th)
- GDP (PPP): 2026 estimate
  - Total: ▲$19.193 trillion (3rd)
  - Per capita: ▲$12,998 (121st)
- GDP (nominal): 2026 estimate
  - Total: ▲$4.060 trillion (6th)
  - Per capita: ▲$2,750 (148th)
- Gini (2022): ▼25.5 low inequality
- HDI (2023): ▲0.685 medium (130th)
- Currency: Indian rupee (₹) (INR)
- Time zone: UTC+05:30 (IST)
- Date format: dd-mm-yyyy (Note: See Date and time notation in India.)
- Calling code: +91
- ISO 3166 code: IN
- Internet TLD: .in (others)

India, officially the Republic of India, (Note: ISO 15919: Bhārat Gaṇarājya) is a country in South Asia. It is the world's seventh-largest country by area and its most populous. Bounded by the Indian Ocean on the south, the Arabian Sea on the southwest, and the Bay of Bengal on the southeast, it shares land borders with Pakistan to the west, (Note: The Government of India also regards Afghanistan as a bordering country, as it considers all of Kashmir to be part of India. However, this is disputed, and the region bordering Afghanistan is administered by Pakistan.) China, Nepal, and Bhutan to the north, and Bangladesh and Myanmar to the east. In the Indian Ocean, India is near Sri Lanka and the Maldives. (Note: India's Andaman and Nicobar Islands share a maritime border with Myanmar, Thailand and Indonesia.)

Modern humans arrived on the Indian subcontinent from Africa by 55,000 years ago. Settled life emerged in the western margins of the Indus river basin 9,000 years ago, evolving into the Indus Valley Civilisation of the third millennium BCE. By 1200 BCE, an archaic form of Sanskrit, an Indo-European language, diffused into India from the northwest, its earliest hymns containing elements of what would become Hinduism. The pre-existing Dravidian and other languages were gradually superseded in India's northern plains. Across the central stretch of these plains, rapid urbanisation took place, and after 500 BCE a caste-based, hereditary form of social stratification began to solidify as Hinduism took fuller shape. During this period, Buddhism and Jainism arose, proclaiming social orders unlinked to heredity. The subsequent emergence of the loose-knit Maurya and Gupta Empires gave rise to wide-ranging cultural and scientific creativity. However, these eras saw a steady decline in women's status, alongside the eventual institutionalisation of untouchability. In South India, across the first millennium CE, the Middle kingdoms transmitted Dravidian language scripts and cultural traditions to Southeast Asia. Well before the millennium's end, Judaism, Christianity, Islam, and Zoroastrianism had become established on India's southern and western coasts.

Early in the 2nd millennium, Muslim armies from Central Asia intermittently overran India's northern plains, eventually establishing the Delhi Sultanate and drawing India into the cosmopolitan networks of medieval Islam. The Vijayanagara Empire built a powerful military-fiscal state that fostered a flourishing, distinctively South Indian Hindu culture. During this era, Sikhism emerged in the Punjab, promoting an egalitarian devotion that transcended traditional Hindu and Muslim boundaries. The Mughal Empire ushered in two centuries of economic expansion and relative peace, leaving a lasting legacy of administrative centralisation and cultural synthesis. The expanding rule of the British East India Company consolidated territorial control over the subcontinent while transforming India into a colonial economy. Crown rule, or the British Raj, began in 1858. Although equality before the law promised to Indians was slow to materialise, both British India and, to a lesser extent, the princely states saw technological changes as modern education and more organised public life took root. A nationalist movement emerged in India, the first in the non-European British Empire. Noted for nonviolent resistance after 1920, it was a major factor in ending British rule. In 1947, the British Indian Empire was partitioned into the independent dominions of a Hindu-majority India and a Muslim-majority Pakistan. The partition brought large-scale loss of life and unprecedented migration.

The Constitution of India was adopted in 1950 and declared India to be a federal republic governed through a democratic parliamentary system; it guarantees freedom of speech, freedom of press, and religious pluralism. Amendments enacted from 1951 onwards strengthened affirmative action programmes to reduce caste inequality. The reorganisation of states in 1956 along linguistic lines institutionalised regional language pride and led to the growth of regional literature and cinema. During the 1970s, India reversed agricultural stagnation through the Green Revolution, achieving national food security. The country also altered the regional power balance through support for Bangladesh and enacted constitutional reform to end princely privileges. India's population grew from 361 million in 1951 to approximately 1.464 billion in 2025. (Note: It surpassed China's population in 2021.) Economic reforms of the 1990s integrated India's economy with the world's. By the 2010s, the Indian economy had a stably high rate of growth. A large middle class and a communications boom gained momentum. However, challenges remain, including widening income gaps, gender inequality and environmental degradation. In recent years, India has seen a political shift toward majoritarianism. A nuclear-weapon state with high military expenditure, India is among the world's largest economies and a founding member of the United Nations, while its cultural legacy encompasses 45 UNESCO World Heritage Sites. India's megadiverse land features four biodiversity hotspots. Its wildlife is supported in protected habitats and traditionally viewed with cultural tolerance.

== Etymology ==
According to the Oxford English Dictionary, the English proper noun "India" derives most immediately from the Classical Latin India, a reference to a loosely-defined historical region of Asia stretching from South Asia to the borders of China. Further etymons are: Hellenistic Greek India (Ἰνδία); Ancient Greek Indos (Ἰνδός), or the River Indus; Achaemenian Old Persian Hinduš (an eastern province of the Achaemenid Empire); and Sanskrit Sindhu, or "river," but specifically the Indus river, and by extension its well-settled basin. The Ancient Greeks referred to South Asians as Indoi, 'the people of the Indus'.

The term Bharat (Bhārat; pronounced [ˈbʱaːɾət]), mentioned in both Indian epic poetry and the Constitution of India, is used in its variations by many Indian languages. A modern rendering of the historical name Bharatavarsha, which applied originally to North India, Bharat gained increased currency from the mid-19th century as a native name for India.

Hindustan ([ɦɪndʊˈstaːn]) is a Middle Persian name for India that became popular by the 13th century, and was used widely since the era of the Mughal Empire. The meaning of Hindustan has varied, referring to a region encompassing the northern Indian subcontinent (present-day northern India and Pakistan) or to India in its near entirety.

== History ==
=== Ancient India ===
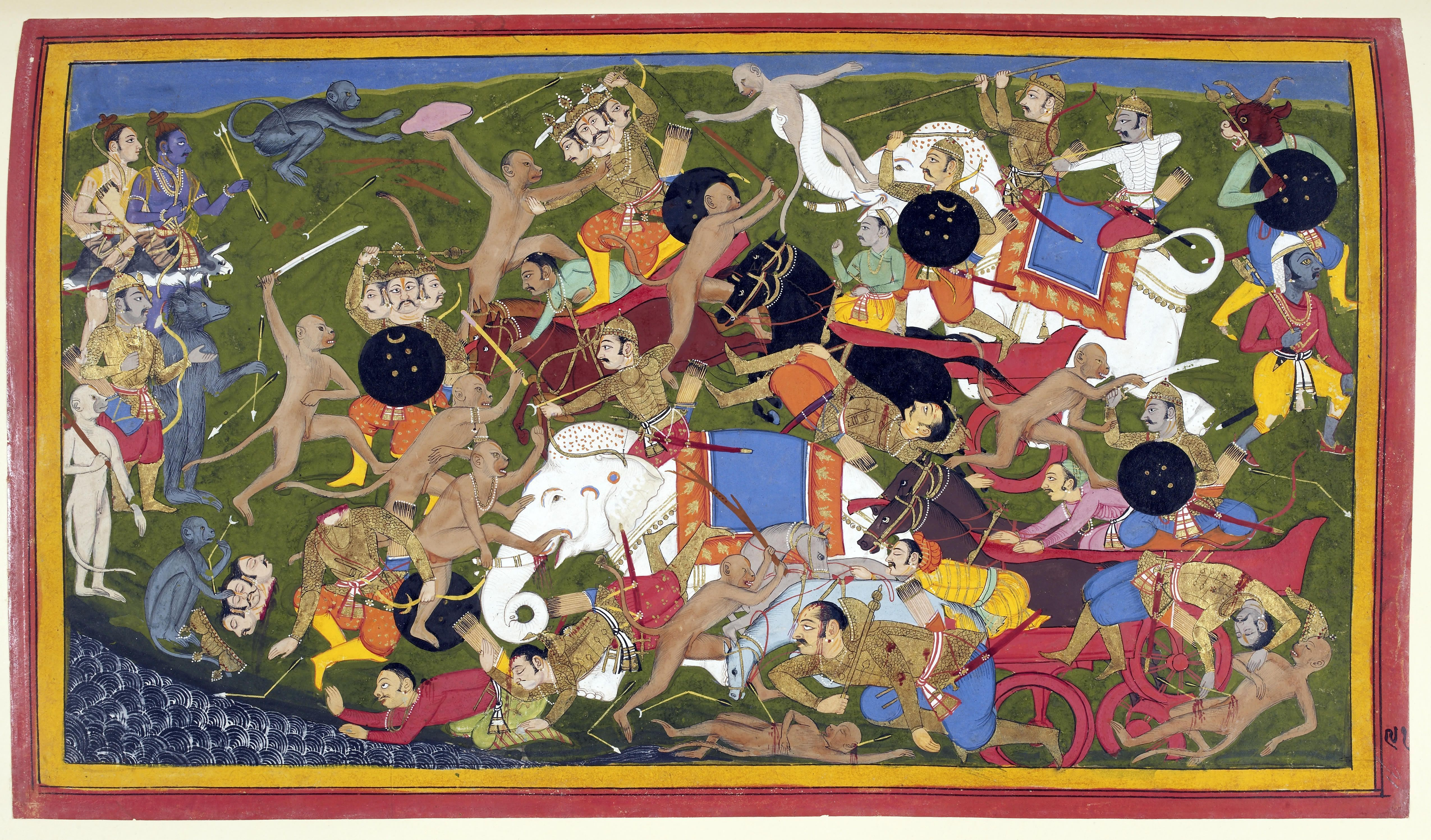
Manuscript illustration, c. 1650, of the Sanskrit epic Ramayana, composed in story-telling fashion c. 400 BCE – c. 300 CE

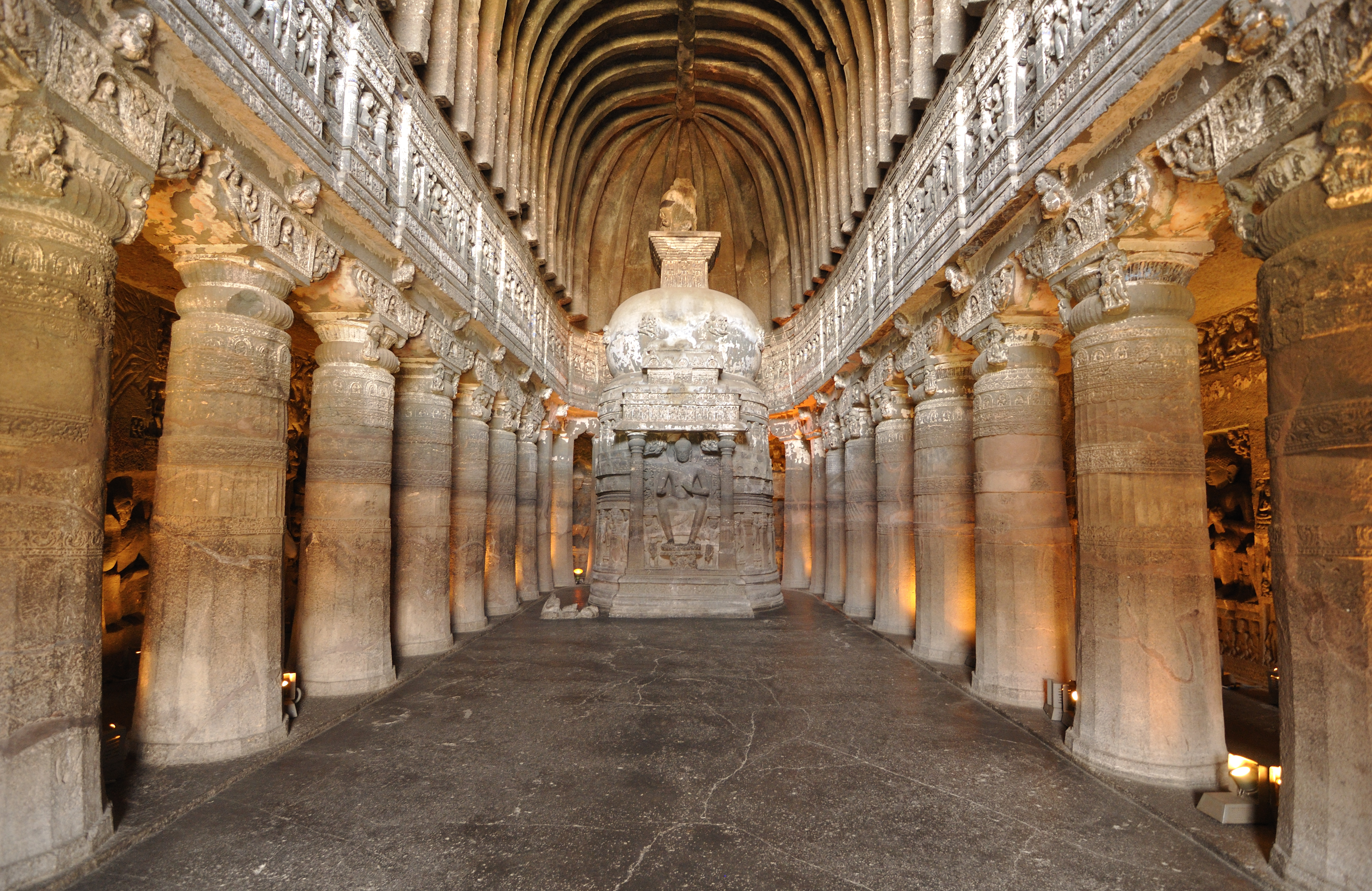
Cave 26, a Buddhist shrine, of the rock-cut Ajanta Caves

Based on coalescence of Mitochondrial DNA and Y Chromosome data, the earliest extant lineages of modern humans on the Indian subcontinent had reached there from Africa between 80,000 and 50,000 years ago, and with high likelihood by 55,000 years ago. (Note: Their long occupation, initially in varying forms of isolation as hunter-gatherers, has made the region highly diverse, second only to Africa in human genetic diversity. However, the earliest known modern human fossils in South Asia date to about 30,000 years ago.) Neolithic and chalcolithic cultures arose in the western margins of the Indus river basin around Mehrgarh in Balochistan, Pakistan after 7000 BCE. (Note: Domestication of grain-producing plants (including barley) and animals (including humped zebu cattle) occurred here.) These gradually evolved into the Indus Valley Civilisation, which flourished during 2500–1900 BCE in Pakistan and western India. Centred around cities such as Mohenjo-daro, Harappa and Dholavira, its characteristic features included steatite seals, a written script, urban planning, terracotta human figures and animal statuettes. (Note: Networks of towns and villages grew around the cities in a new agro-pastoral economy.) Between 1500 BCE and 1200 BCE, an archaic form of Sanskrit, an Indo-European language, diffused into India from the northwest. Its evidence today is found in the Rig Veda—the scripture associated with the historical Vedic religion, one of the progenitors of what later became Hinduism. (Note: The Rig Veda was composed by Indo-Aryan-speaking tribes migrating east from what is today northern Afghanistan and across the Punjab region.) The settling of the Ganges river plain took place during the next millennium, when swathes of the river system's adjoining regions were deforested (Note: This was done at times by setting fires, or later by employing iron implements.) and prepared for agriculture. (Note: The settlement may have involved driving the preexisting people out or enslaving them.) The Dravidian and other languages of India were supplanted in the north, creating a broad language family-divide, with the Indo-Aryan languages being spoken mainly in the north and west, and the Dravidian in some parts of east India and most of the south. (Note: Classical Sanskrit, a refined and standardised grammatical form would emerge in the mid-1st millennium BCE and was codified in the Aṣṭādhyāyī ('Eight chapters') of Pāṇini. (Note: "All these achievements are dwarfed, though, by the Sanskrit linguistic tradition culminating in the famous grammar by Pāṇini, known as the Aṣṭhādhyāyī. The elegance and comprehensiveness of its architecture have yet to be surpassed by any grammar of any language, and its ingenious methods of stratifying out use and mention, language and metalanguage, and theorem and metatheorem predate key discoveries in western philosophy by millennia.") The two major Sanskrit epics, the Mahābhārata and the Rāmāyaṇa, however, were composed in a range of oral storytelling registers called Epic Sanskrit which was used in northern India between 400 BCE and 300 CE, and roughly contemporary with classical Sanskrit.)

A second urbanisation took place in India by the middle-first-millennium BCE. In fortified cities in the central Ganges plain, social differentiation by caste, or varna, emerged. Also, by the mid-millennium, two new religions arose: Jainism, based on the teachings of Mahavira, and Buddhism, based on those of the Buddha. Both stressed non-violence and abjured animal sacrifices conducted in Brahmanism (Note: the further developed mid-first-millennium form of the historic religion of the Vedas, and the precursor to Hinduism) and birth into a fixed hereditary varna. By living ethically, lay people could rise socially and morally in these religions. (Note: Chronicling the life of the Buddha was central to the beginnings of recorded history in India.) The rise of the two religions was a backdrop to the emergence of the first loose-knit, geographically extensive power in South Asia, the Maurya Empire. During the rule of the founder's grandson, Ashoka (ca. 268–232 BCE), the empire briefly controlled the subcontinent's major urban hubs and arteries, except in the deep south. (Note: The Mauryan economy was helped by the rise of Buddhism and Jainism, creeds that promoted nonviolence, proscribed ostentation, or superfluous sacrifices and rituals, and reduced the costs of economic transactions; by coinage that increased economic accommodation in the region; and by the use of writing, which might have boosted more intricate business dealings.) (Note: To promote movement and trade, the Mauryans built roads, most prominently a chiefly winter-time road—the Uttarapath—which connected eastern Afghanistan to their capital Pataliputra, during the time of year when the water levels in the intersecting rivers were low, and they could be easily forded.) The empire's period was notable for creativity in art, architecture, inscriptions, and produced texts. Following his conquest of Kalinga, in which his forces caused immense loss of life, Ashoka adopted Buddhism, and subsequently commissioned numerous rock and pillar edicts throughout the Maurya Empire to promote ethical conduct, non-violence, and social welfare. (Note: Because the edicts forbade both the killing of wild animals and the destruction of forests, some modern environmental historians see Ashoka as an early embodiment of that ethos.)

By the 4th and 5th centuries CE, the Gupta Empire had created a system of administration and taxation in the greater Ganges Plain; this system became a model for later Indian kingdoms. Under the Guptas, a renewed Hinduism based on devotion, rather than the management of ritual, began to assert itself. The renewal was reflected in a flowering of art, literature, and science. However, the eras of the two empires also witnessed a steady erosion of women's rights, and, by the end, the institutionalisation of untouchability. In South India, the Sangam literature of the Tamil language reveals that, between 200 BCE and 200 CE, the southern peninsula was ruled by the Cheras and the Cholas, along the western and eastern plains, respectively, of the Kaveri river valley, and the Pandyas farther south along the Vaigai river valley. By the sixth century, the Pallavas had grown into a regional power. Simultaneously, Buddhism and Jainism, which had favoured a conservative transactionalism, were replaced by kingly devotion to the gods of particular places, which became a characteristic of the Bhakti movement. The Pallavas, in particular, traded extensively with the Roman Empire and with West and Southeast Asia.

=== Medieval India ===
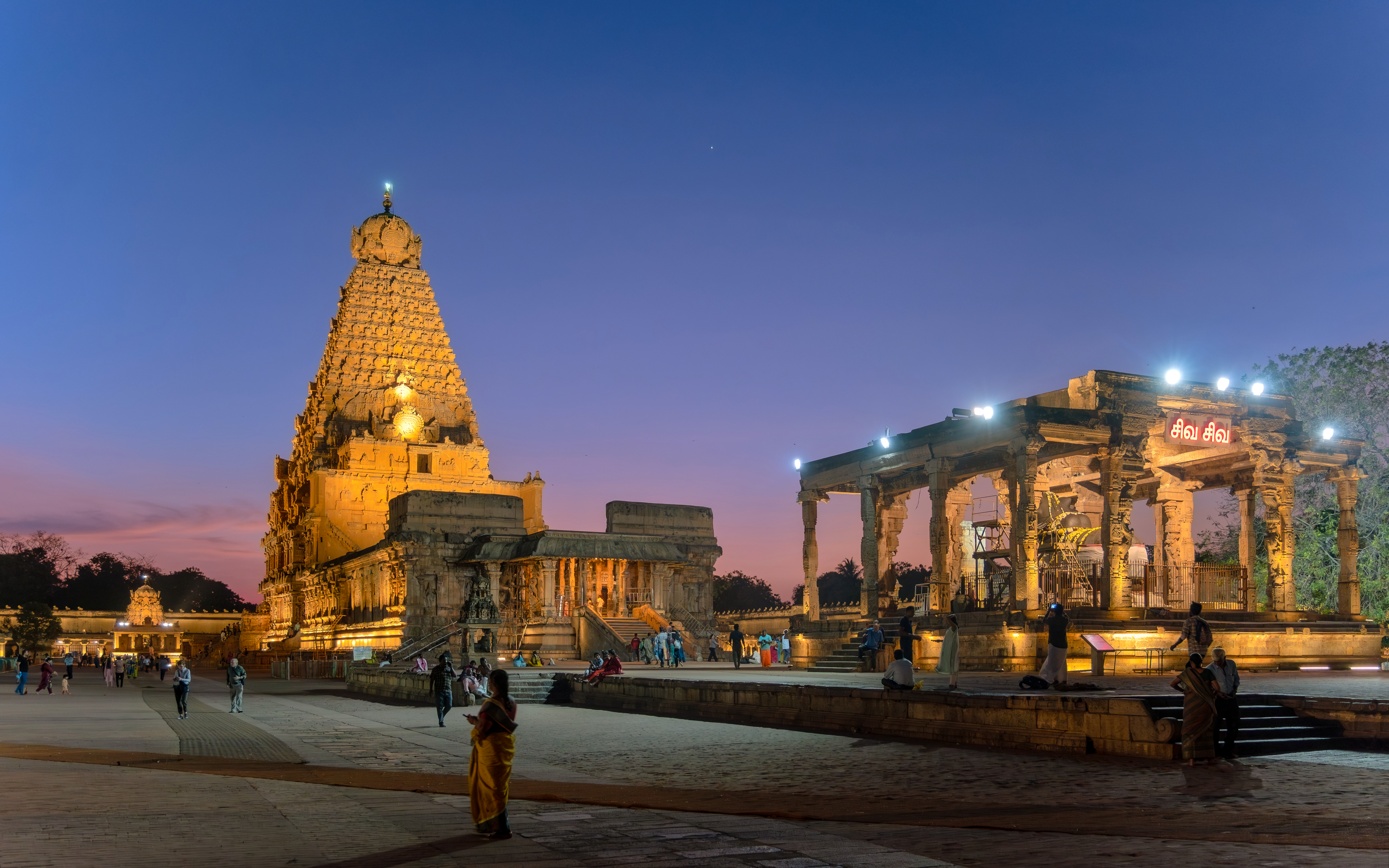
The Brihadisvara Temple, built by Chola monarch Rajaraja I between 1003 and 1010 CE

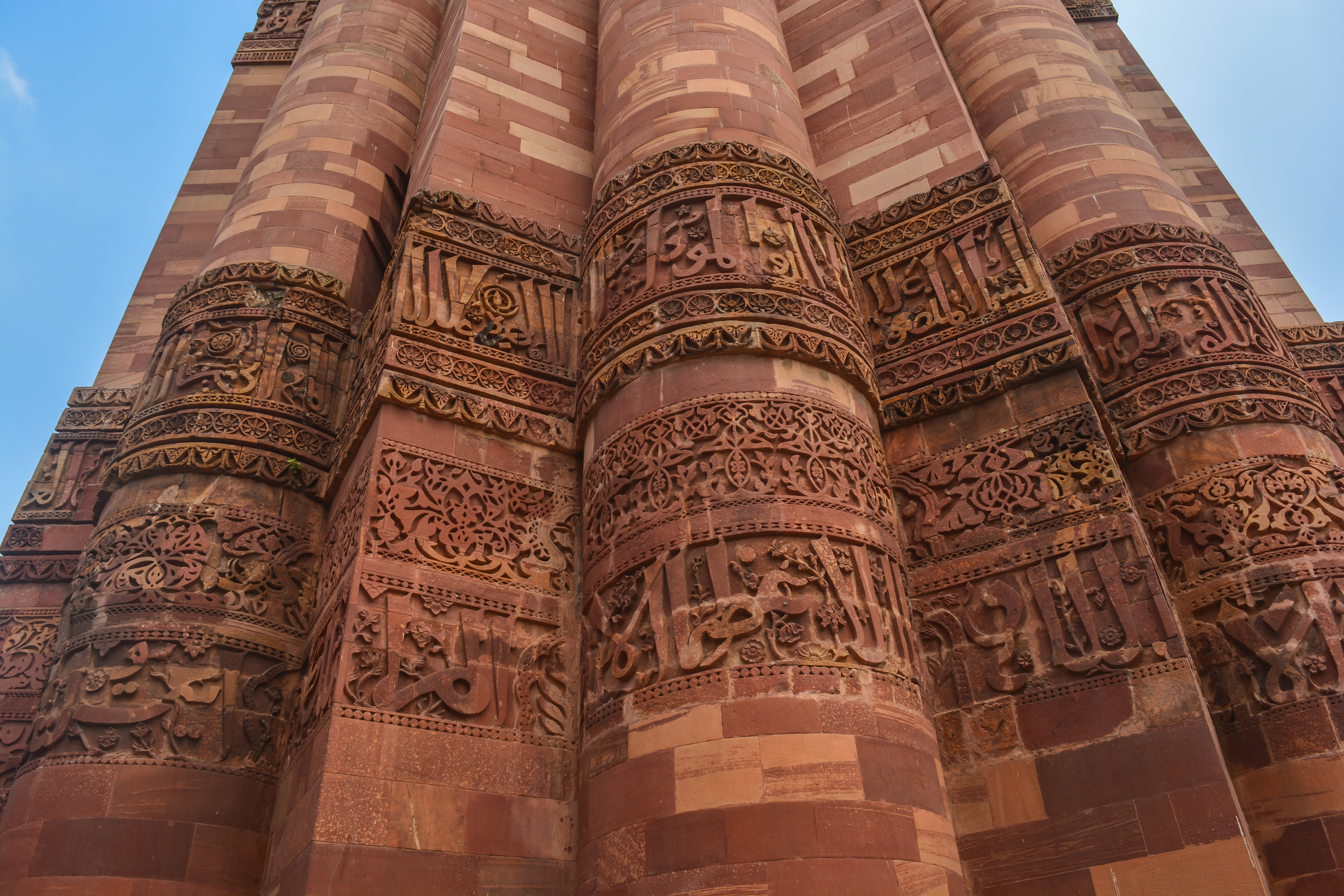
Calligraphy on the Qutb Minar, built in the Delhi Sultanate from 1199 CE to 1220 CE

The Indian early medieval age, from 600 to 1200 CE, was defined by regional kingdoms and cultural diversity. (Note: No ruler of this period was able to create an empire and consistently control lands much beyond their core region. When Harsha of Kannauj, who ruled much of the Indo-Gangetic Plain from 606 to 647 CE, attempted to expand southwards, he was defeated by the Chalukya ruler of the Deccan. When his successor attempted to expand eastwards, he was defeated by the Pala king of Bengal. When the Chalukyas attempted to expand southwards, they were defeated by the Pallavas from farther south, who in turn were opposed by the Pandyas and the Cholas from still farther south.) During this time, as land was cleared for agriculture, pastoral peoples and new non-traditional ruling classes were integrated into caste society. The caste system consequently began to show regional differences. In the 6th and 7th centuries, the first devotional hymns were composed in Tamil. They were emulated across India, leading to a resurgence of Hinduism and laying the groundwork for the subcontinent's regional languages. Indian royalty and the temples they supported drew large numbers of citizens to the capital cities, which grew into economic hubs. (Note: Temple towns of various sizes began to appear everywhere as India underwent another urbanisation.) By the 8th and 9th centuries, South Indian culture and political systems spread across Southeast Asia. (Note: Lands that are today part of Thailand, Cambodia, Vietnam, and Indonesia.) (Note: Indian merchants, scholars, and sometimes armies were involved in this transmission; Southeast Asians took the initiative as well, with many sojourning in Indian seminaries and translating Buddhist and Hindu texts into their languages.) In the second half of the first millennium CE, Judaism, Christianity, Islam and Zoroastrianism established roots on India's southern and western coasts.

After the 10th century, Muslim Central Asian nomadic clans—using swift-horse cavalry and raising vast armies united by ethnicity—repeatedly overran South Asia's north-western plains, leading eventually to the establishment of the Islamic Delhi Sultanate in 1206, and drawing India into the Islamic cosmopolis. The Sultanate, which came to control much of North India and made many forays into South India, initially disrupted Indian elites, but largely left its vast non-Muslim subject population to its own laws and customs. By repeatedly repulsing Mongol raiders in the 13th century, the sultanate saved India from the devastation visited on West and Central Asia, setting the scene for centuries of migration of fleeing soldiers, scholars, mystics, and artisans from those regions into the subcontinent, thereby creating a syncretic Indo-Islamic culture in the north. The sultanate's raiding and weakening of the regional kingdoms of South India paved the way for the indigenous Vijayanagara Empire. Embracing a strong Shaivite tradition and building upon the military technology of the sultanate, the empire came to control a large portion of peninsular India, and influenced South Indian society long after.

=== Early modern India ===
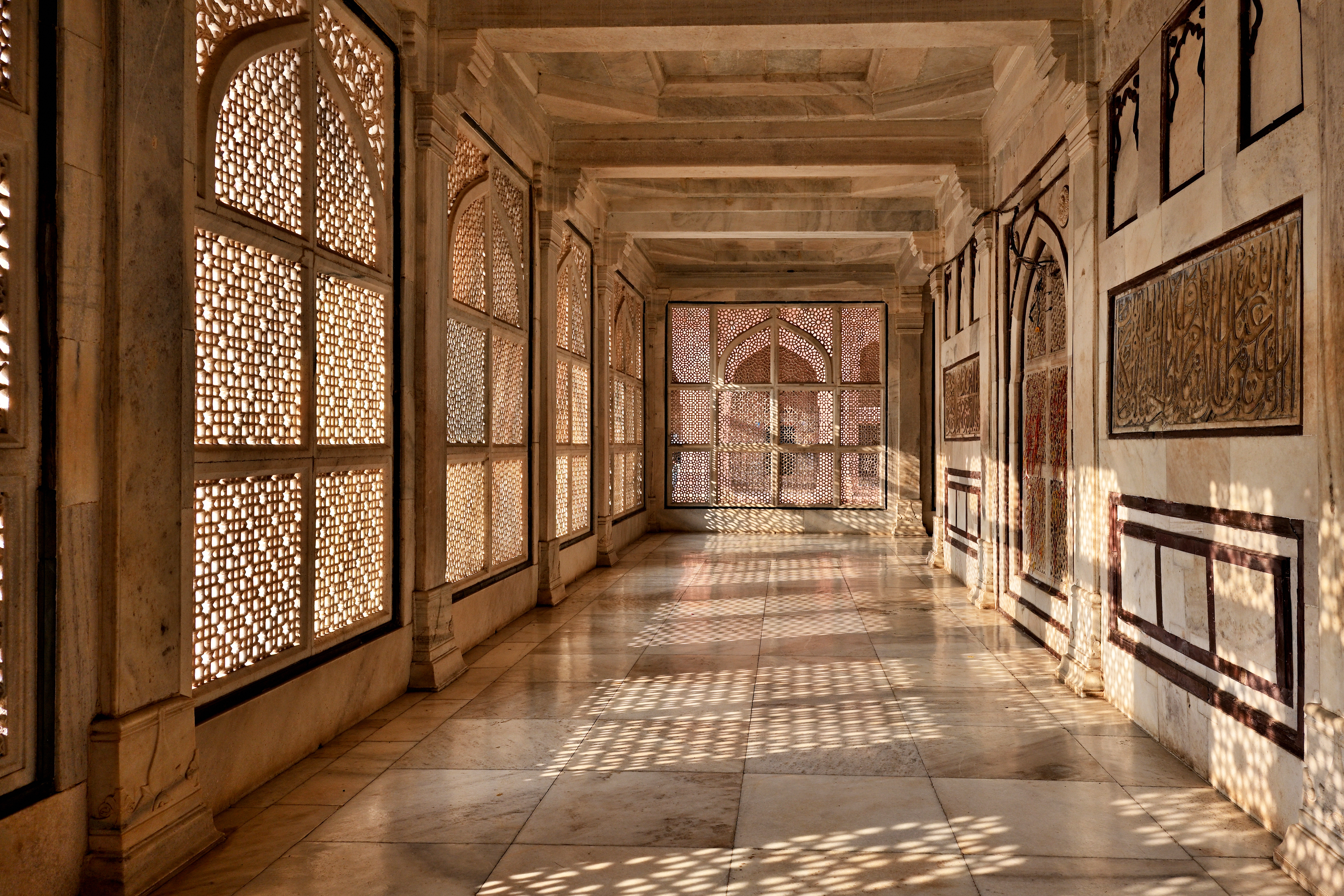
The dargah of Sufi Salim Chisti, built by Mughal emperor, Akbar, early 17th century

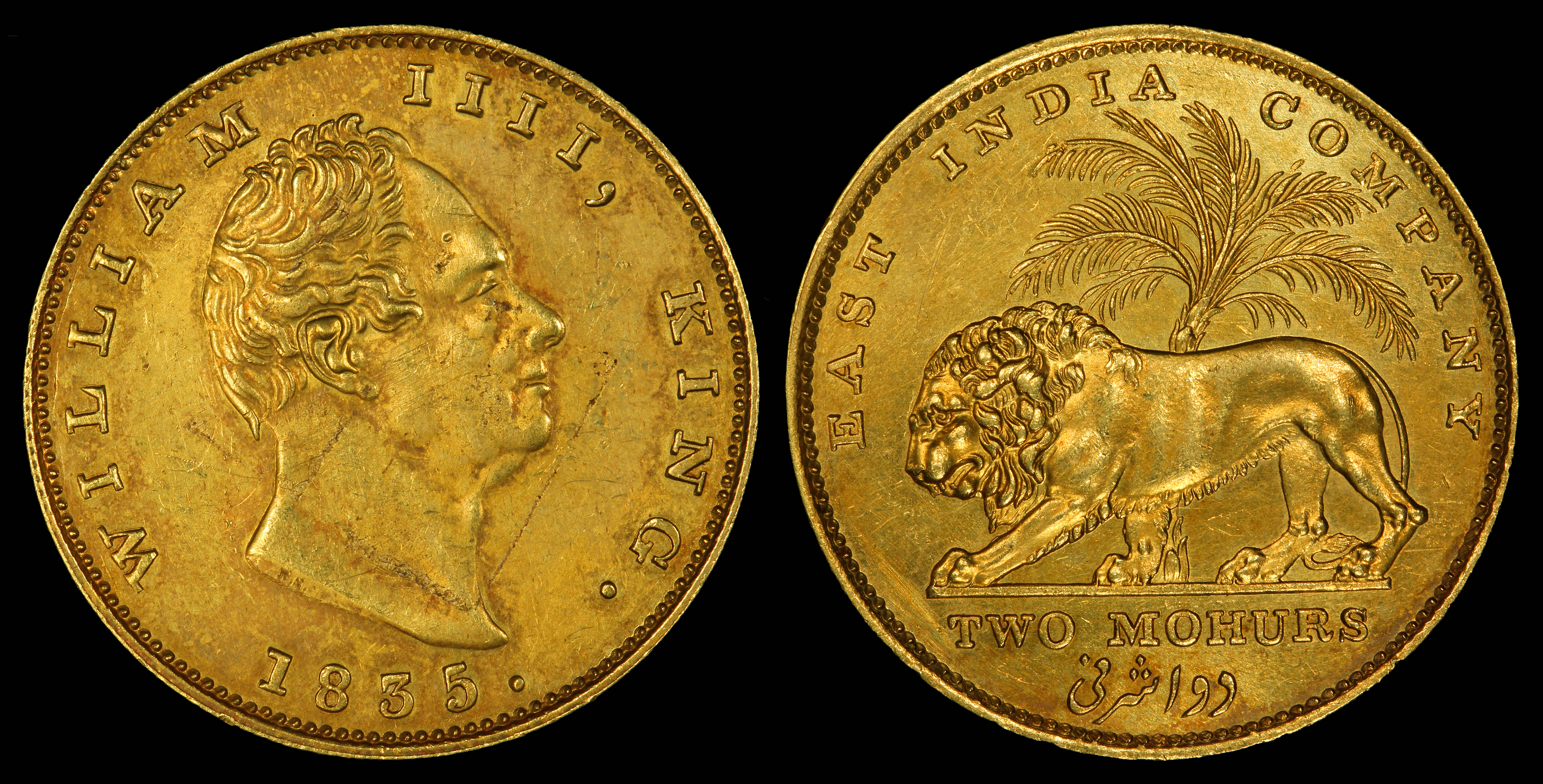
An East India Company rule gold mohur, issued during the reign of William IIII

In the early 16th century, northern India—then mainly under Muslim rulers—fell again to the superior mobility and firepower of a new generation of Central Asian warriors. The resulting Mughal Empire did not stamp out the local societies it came to rule. Instead, it balanced and pacified them through new administrative practices and diverse and inclusive ruling elites. This led to more systematic, centralised, and uniform rule. By departing from tribal bonds and exclusive Islamic identity, particularly under Akbar, the Mughals united their vast empire through personal loyalty to a near-divine emperor, expressed through a shared Persianised culture.

The Mughal state derived most revenue from agriculture. Its economic policies mandated tax payments in a well-regulated silver currency, and integrated peasants and artisans into larger markets. The relative peace the empire maintained across much of the 17th century helped drive India's economic expansion. Mughal ruling classes fostered extensive patronage of the arts, including painting, literary forms, textiles, and architecture. Newly coherent social groups in northern and western India, such as the Marathas, the Rajputs, and the Sikhs, gained governing ambitions during Mughal rule. Through collaboration or adversity, the Mughals gave them recognition and military experience. Expanding commerce gave rise to new Indian commercial and political elites along the coasts of southern and eastern India. From the late 17th century, the Mughal Empire gradually began to disintegrate, and these local elites and communities frequently gained greater autonomy and self-governance.

By the early 18th century, the lines between commercial enterprise and political sovereignty had become increasingly blurred. European chartered companies solidified their presence in India through fortified coastal outposts; most notable was the English East India Company. Its control of the seas, greater resources, and more advanced military training and technology led it to assert its military strength increasingly and caused it to become attractive to a portion of the Indian elite; these factors were crucial in allowing the company to gain control over the Bengal region by 1765 and sideline the other European companies. Its further access to the riches of Bengal and the subsequent increased strength and size of its army enabled it to annexe or subdue most of India by the 1820s. India no longer exported manufactured goods as it long had, but instead supplied the British Empire with raw materials. Many historians consider this to be the onset of India's colonial period. By this time, with its economic power severely curtailed by the British Parliament and having effectively been made an arm of British administration, the East India Company began more consciously to enter non-economic arenas, including education, social reform, and culture.

=== Modern India ===
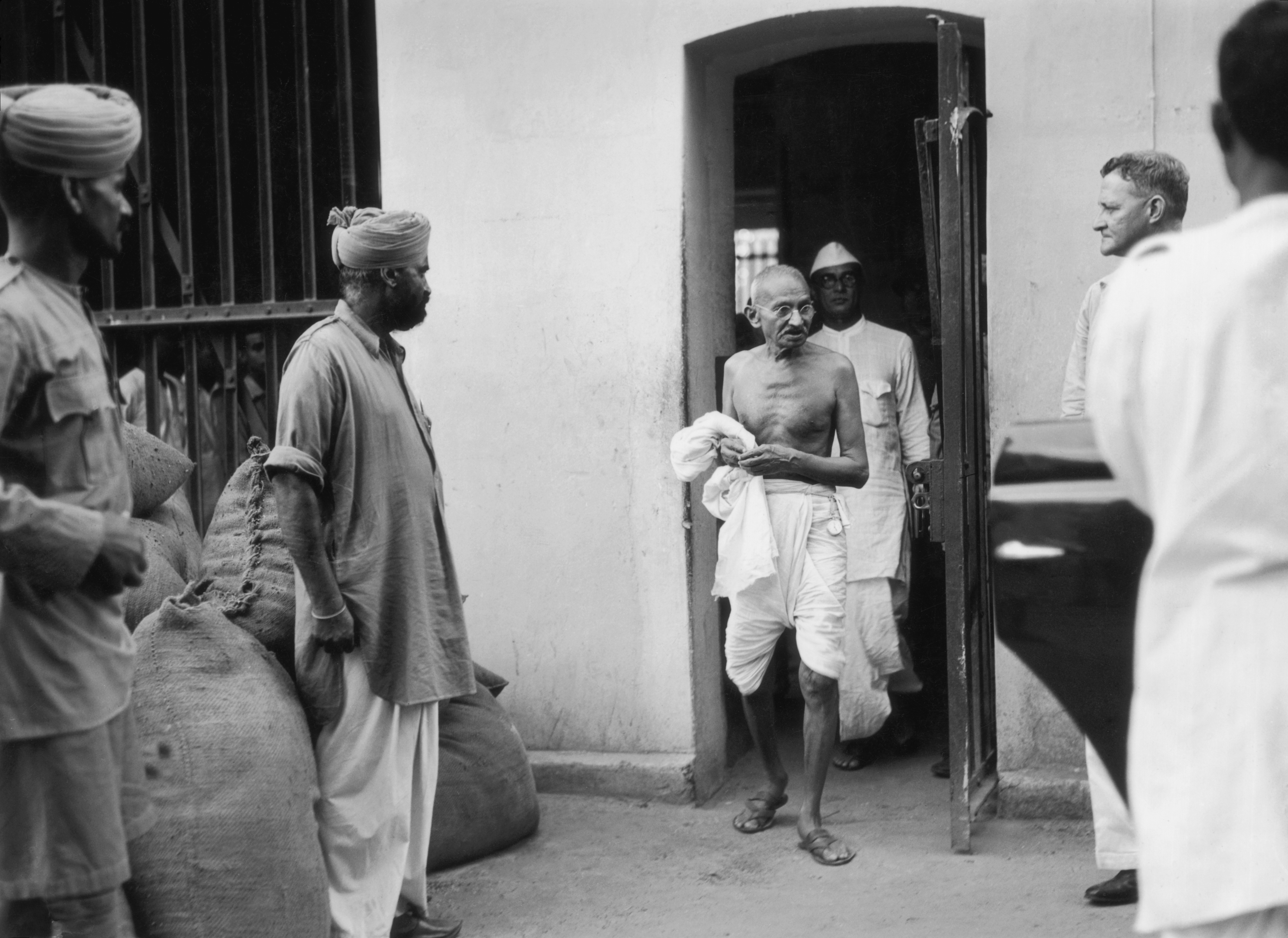
Mahatma Gandhi after a visit to the Presidency Jail, Calcutta, April 1938

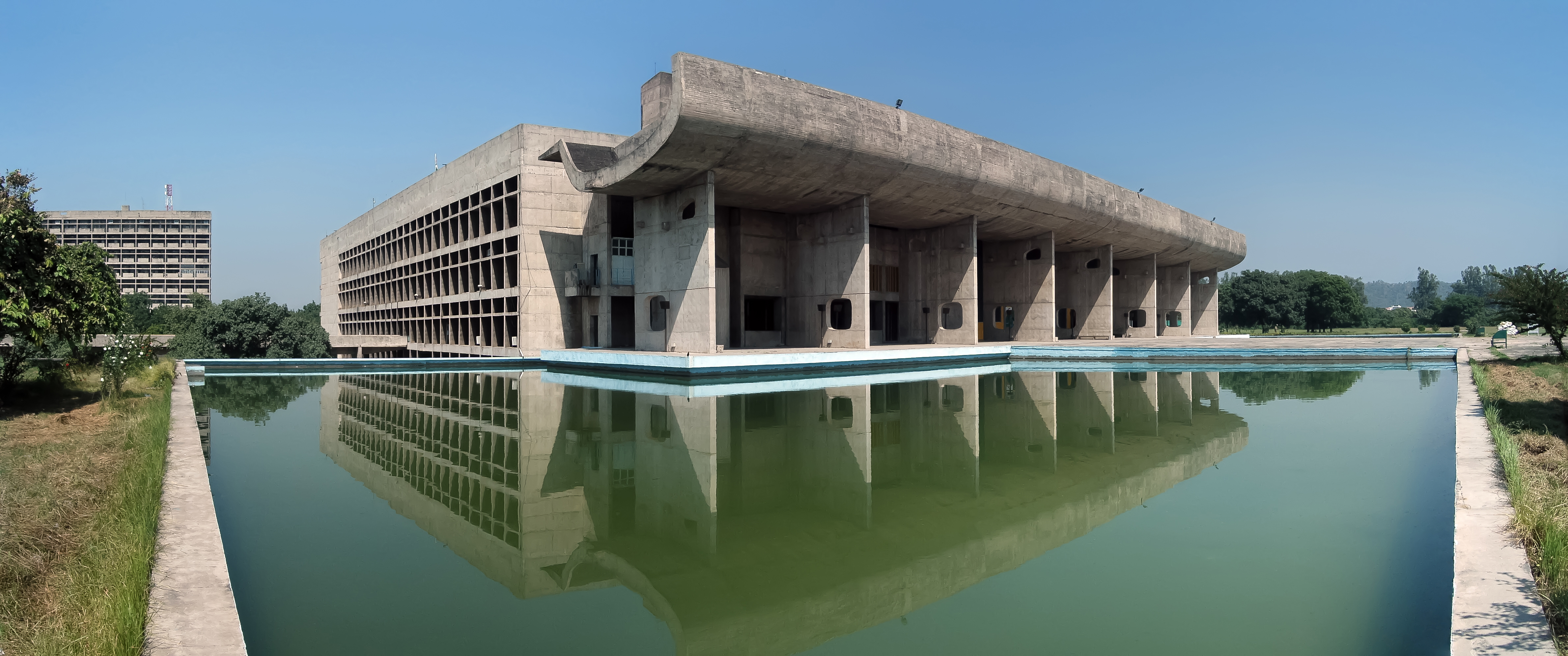
The Capitol Complex in Chandigarh, commissioned after India's 1947 partition

The 1848 appointment of Lord Dalhousie as the Governor General of the East India Company set the stage for changes essential to a modern state: consolidating and demarcating sovereignty, monitoring the population through censuses, educating citizens and rationalising the bureaucracy. Technological advancements—among them, railways, canals, and the telegraph—were introduced within years of their introduction in Europe, with the East India Company guaranteeing fixed financial returns to attract British private investors. Simultaneously, the proponents of these public works lobbied the British government for support, presenting them as necessities for military logistics and security and Indian social and cultural reform. Thus, the Upper Doab's Ganges Canal—conceived by Proby Cautley under Lord Auckland and completed under Dalhousie—was promoted to Company's Court of Directors in London as both a vital relief response to the Agra famine of 1837–1838 and a revenue-generating irrigation and navigation project. The canal, which brought agricultural prosperity to some areas, ultimately caused soil salinisation in others.

Disaffection with the company also grew during this time, culminating in the Indian Rebellion of 1857, which swept across the central Gangetic plain, and extended into Central India. Shaking the foundations of Company rule, the uprising was provoked by diverse resentments and perceptions, including invasive British-style social reforms, harsh land taxes, and summary treatment of some wealthy landowners and princes. Yet the presumed causes of the uprising did not translate uniformly into actual rebellion. The rebel leaders proclaimed no coherent articles of faith that presaged a new political system. Crucially, many regions of India—including the Punjab, the Madras and Bombay presidencies—did not join the rebellion, thereby ensuring its ultimate defeat; neither did the Bengali intelligentsia, nor the major princely states. After the rebellion was suppressed in 1858, the East India Company was disbanded, and the British government assumed direct administration of India. Proclaiming a unitary state and a gradual but limited British-style parliamentary system, the new rulers also protected princes and landed gentry as a feudal safeguard against future unrest. In the decades following, a more organised public life gradually emerged across India, eventually leading to the founding of the Indian National Congress in 1885.

Rapid commercialisation of agriculture in the second half of the 19th century brought severe economic setbacks, leaving many small farmers dependent on the uncertainties of distant markets. This period saw a rise in the frequency of large-scale famines; moreover, despite the risks of infrastructure development being borne by Indian taxpayers, little industrial employment was generated for the local population. However, commercial cropping, especially in the newly canal-irrigated Punjab, did increase food production for internal consumption. The expanding railway network provided critical famine relief, notably reduced the cost of moving goods, and helped nascent Indian-owned industry. The famines were systematically documented, leading to the publication of the Indian Famine Codes and reports of the Indian Famine Commissions of 1880, 1897, and 1901.

During World War I, more than one million Indians served and Indian land taxes made substantial financial contributions to the Allied war effort. After the war, the British enacted limited constitutional reforms but also repressive legislation, galvanising Mahatma Gandhi, newly arrived from South Africa, to launch a nonviolent non-cooperation movement. In the late 1920s and early 1930s, ideas from Bolshevism and anarchism electrified a growing militancy across the subcontinent and injected a new urgency into the Congress's civil-disobedience movement. Starting in the mid-1930s, the British introduced legislative reforms including special representation for India's untouchables, and the Government of India Act of 1935, a blueprint for a federated state with extensive provincial autonomy; the Indian National Congress won victories in the resulting elections. The next decade was punctuated by escalating crises: the British Viceroy's unilateral declaration of India's entry into World War II, the resignation of the provincial Congress ministries, the party's 1942 push for non-cooperation, the subsequent jailing of its leaders, and an upsurge of Muslim nationalism. After the war, the Muslim League's sweeping success in the 1946 provincial elections was a critical turning point; by securing the Muslim-reserved seats, it established a Muslim mandate for Pakistan that led eventually to the partition of British India. Two new nations, Pakistan and India, came into existence on 14–15 August 1947, accompanied by widespread loss of life and an unprecedented migration.

The Constitution of India was adopted in 1950 and declared India to be a federal republic governed through a democratic parliamentary system; it guaranteed freedom of speech, freedom of press, and religious pluralism. Amendments enacted from 1951 onwards strengthened affirmative action programmes to dismantle caste system inequalities. The States Reorganisation Act of 1956, which redrew provincial boundaries along linguistic lines, institutionalised regional language pride and led to the growth of regional language literature and cinema. In 1971, the creation of Bangladesh altered the regional power balance; the abolition of princely privileges removed the last vestiges of India's feudal order. During this time, India's population grew rapidly: it rose from 361 million in 1951, to approximately 1.464 billion in 2025, surpassing China's in 2021. Economic reforms of the 1990s integrated India's economy with the world's, reducing government regulations on domestic and foreign private businesses. By the mid-2010s, India's economy was rapidly growing, most notably in information technology services. India had a large, consumption-driven middle class and witnessed a communications boom. However, India's economic growth has been accompanied by widening income gaps, gender inequality, and degradation of the environment. In recent years, India has witnessed a shift toward majoritarianism and Hindu nationalism, which has led to democratic erosion.

== Geography ==
=== Geology ===
India accounts for the bulk of the Indian subcontinent, lying atop the Indian tectonic plate, a part of the Indo-Australian Plate. India's defining geologic processes began approximately 70 million years ago, when the Indian Plate, then part of the southern supercontinent Gondwana, began a north-eastward drift caused by seafloor spreading to its south-west, and later, south and south-east. Simultaneously, the vast Tethyan oceanic crust, to its northeast, began to subduct under the Eurasian Plate. The Indian continental crust was obstructed and was sheared horizontally; while its lower crust and mantle slid beneath Eurasia, the upper layer piled up in sheets ahead of the subduction zone. This mountain-building orogeny created the Himalayas. The middle and stiffer layer continued to push into Tibet, causing crustal thickening of the Tibetan Plateau. Immediately south of the emerging Himalayas, plate movement created a vast crescent-shaped trough that rapidly filled with river-borne sediment and now constitutes the Indo-Gangetic Plain. The original Indian plate makes its first appearance above the sediment in the ancient Aravalli Range, which extends from the Delhi Ridge in a southwesterly direction. To the west lies the Thar Desert, whose eastern spread is checked by the Aravallis.

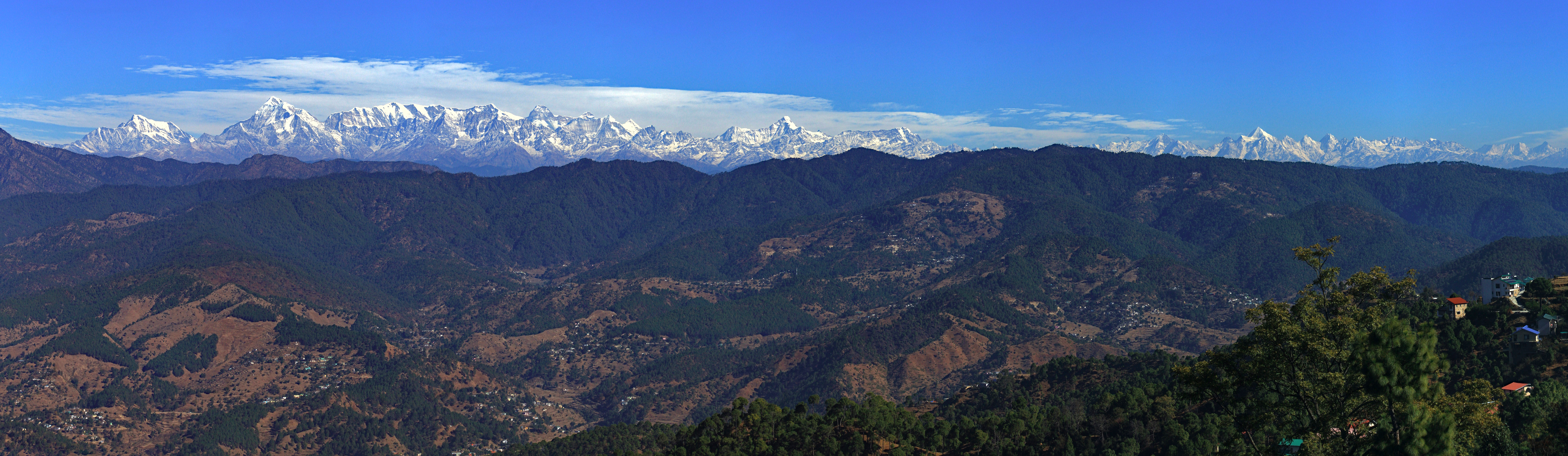
A panoramic view of the Garhwal and Kumaon Himalayas. Peaks rising above their surroundings are, among others, Trisul, Nanda Devi, the highest peak entirely within India's borders, and Nanda Kot. The Tibetan Plateau lies behind these mountains, as does the part of the Indus-Yarlung suture zone, the contour along which the Indian Plate has welded to the Eurasian plate. Mount Kailash and Lake Manasarovar in the Tibet Trans-Himalaya—sacred in Hindu and Buddhist mythology—lie immediately behind to the right. The Indus and Yarlung Tsangpo (the upper Brahmaputra river), which mark the western and eastern limits of the Himalaya range, rise near the lake.

=== Physical geography ===
The Indian Plate survives as peninsular India, the oldest and geologically most stable part of the country. It extends as far north as the Satpura and Vindhya ranges in central India. These parallel chains run from the Arabian Sea coast in Gujarat in the west to the coal-rich Chota Nagpur Plateau in Jharkhand in the east. To the south, the peninsular landmass, the Deccan Plateau, is flanked on the west and east by coastal ranges known as Western and Eastern Ghats; the plateau contains the country's oldest rock formations, some over one billion years old. Geographically, India lies to the north of the equator between 6° 44′ and 35° 30′ north latitude (Note: The northernmost point under Indian control is the disputed Siachen Glacier in Jammu and Kashmir; however, the Government of India regards the entire region of the former princely state of Jammu and Kashmir, including Gilgit-Baltistan administered by Pakistan, to be its territory. It therefore assigns the latitude 37° 6′ to its northernmost point.) and 68° 7′ and 97° 25′ east longitude.

Major Himalayan-origin rivers that substantially flow through India include the Ganges and the Brahmaputra, both of which drain into the Bay of Bengal. Important tributaries of the Ganges include the Yamuna and the Kosi. The Kosi's extremely low gradient, caused by long-term silt deposition, leads to severe floods and course changes. Major peninsular rivers, whose steeper gradients prevent extensive flooding, include the Godavari, the Mahanadi, the Kaveri, and the Krishna, which also drain into the Bay of Bengal; and the Narmada and the Tapti, which drain into the Arabian Sea.

India's coastline measures 7,517 kilometres (4,700 mi) in length; of this distance, 5,423 kilometres (3,400 mi) belong to peninsular India and 2,094 kilometres (1,300 mi) to the Andaman, Nicobar, and Lakshadweep island chains. According to the Indian naval hydrographic charts, the mainland coastline consists of 43% sandy beaches, 11% rocky shores including cliffs, and 46% mudflats or marshy shores. Coastal features include the marshy Rann of Kutch of western India and the alluvial Sundarbans delta of eastern India, the latter shared with Bangladesh. India has two archipelagos: the Lakshadweep coral atolls off the south-western coast, and the Andaman and Nicobar Islands, a volcanic chain in the Andaman Sea.

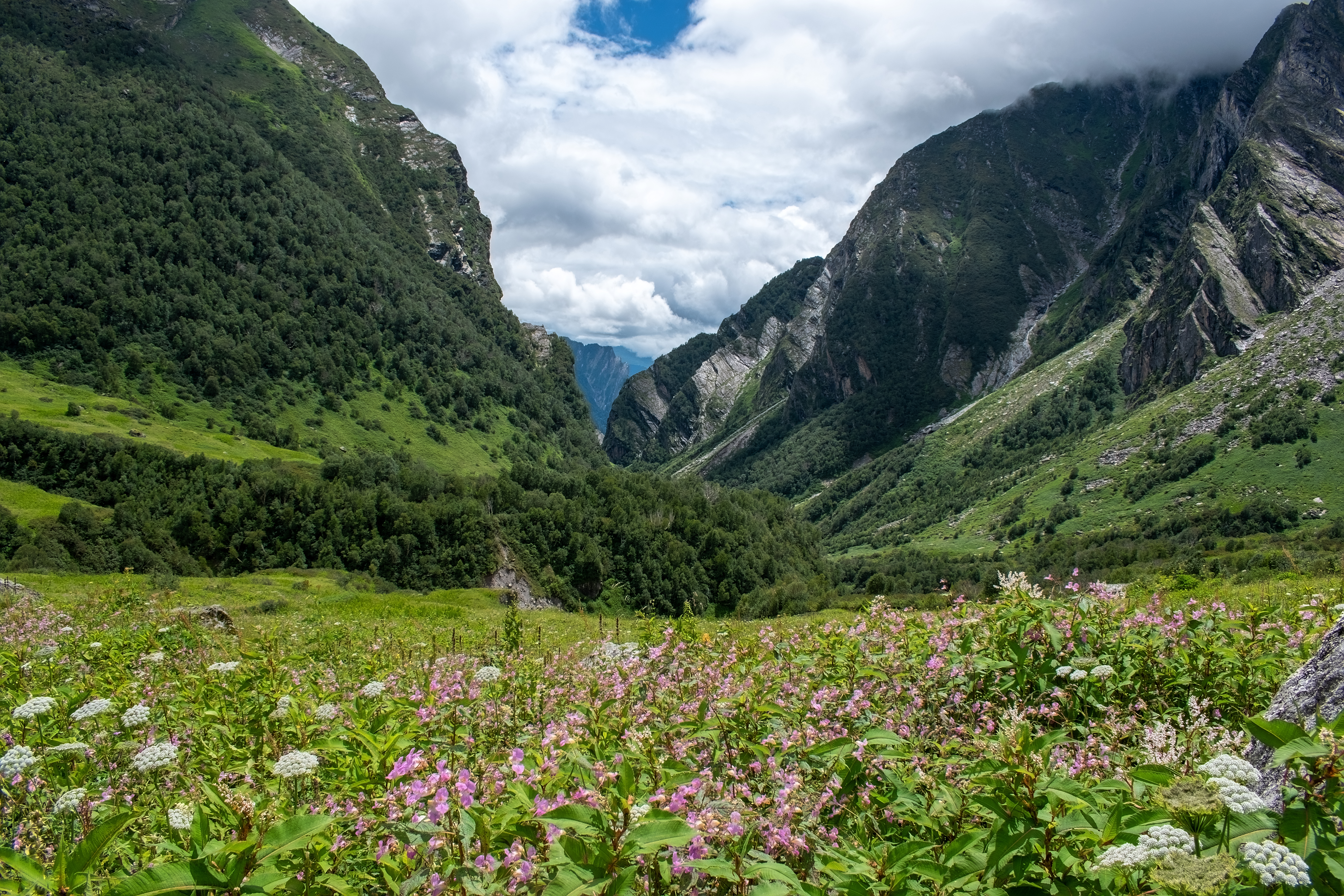
The Valley of Flowers National Park, Uttarakhand, average altitude 3,500 metres (11,500 ft), a UNESCO World Heritage Site

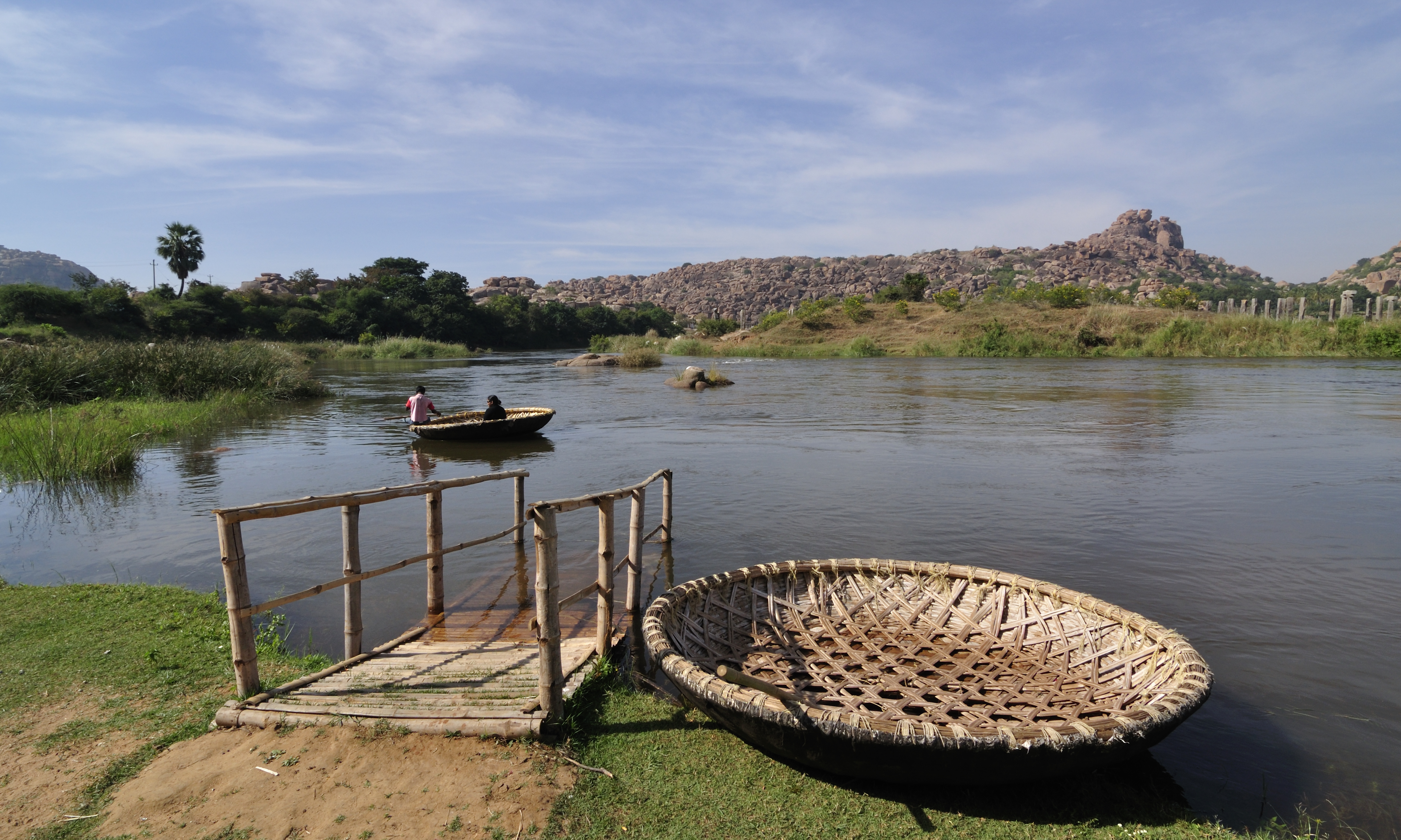
The Tungabhadra, with rocky outcrops, flows into the peninsular Krishna River.

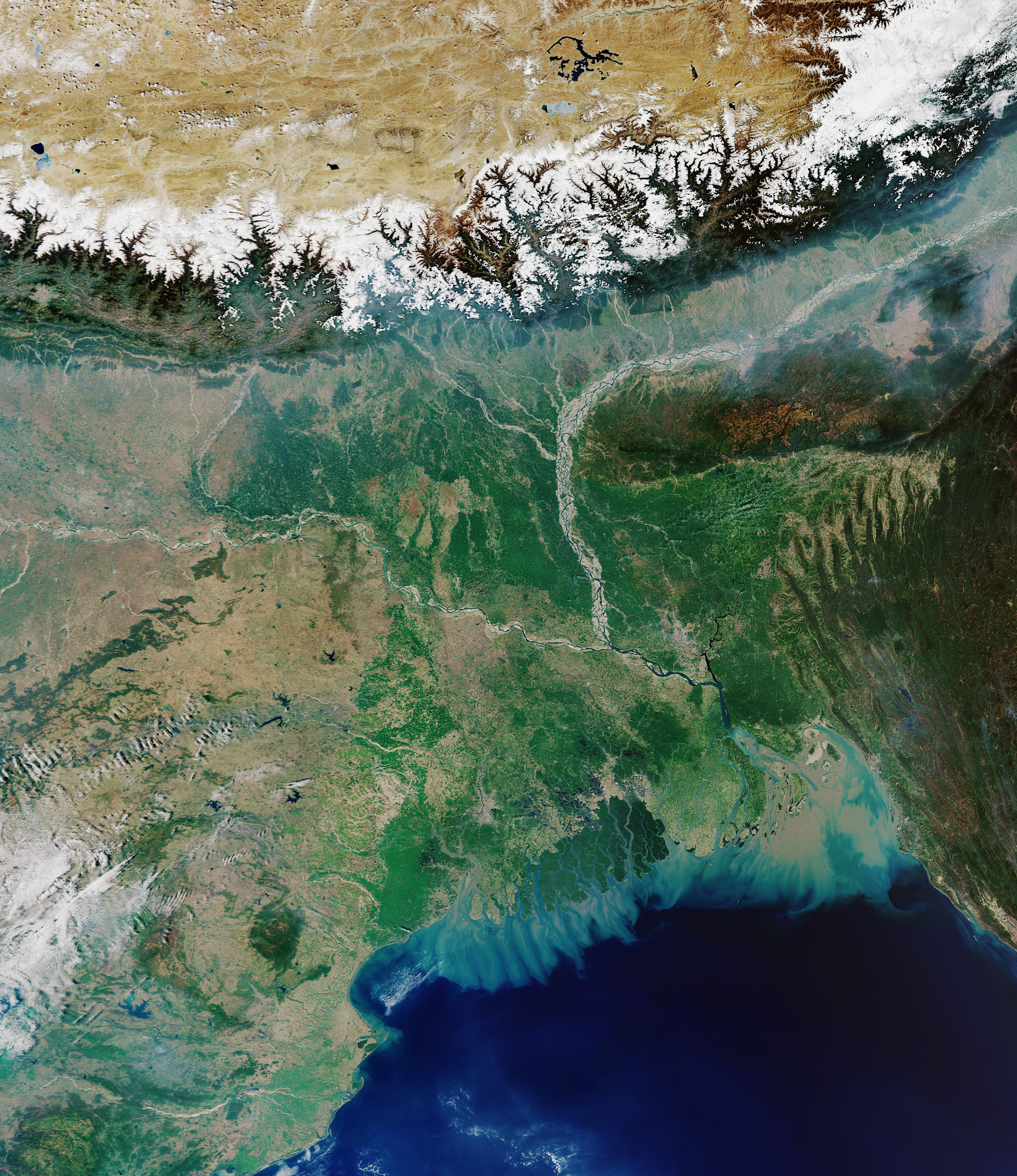
The Ganges-Brahmaputra Delta (Sentinel-3B image). Ganges l., Brahmaputra r.

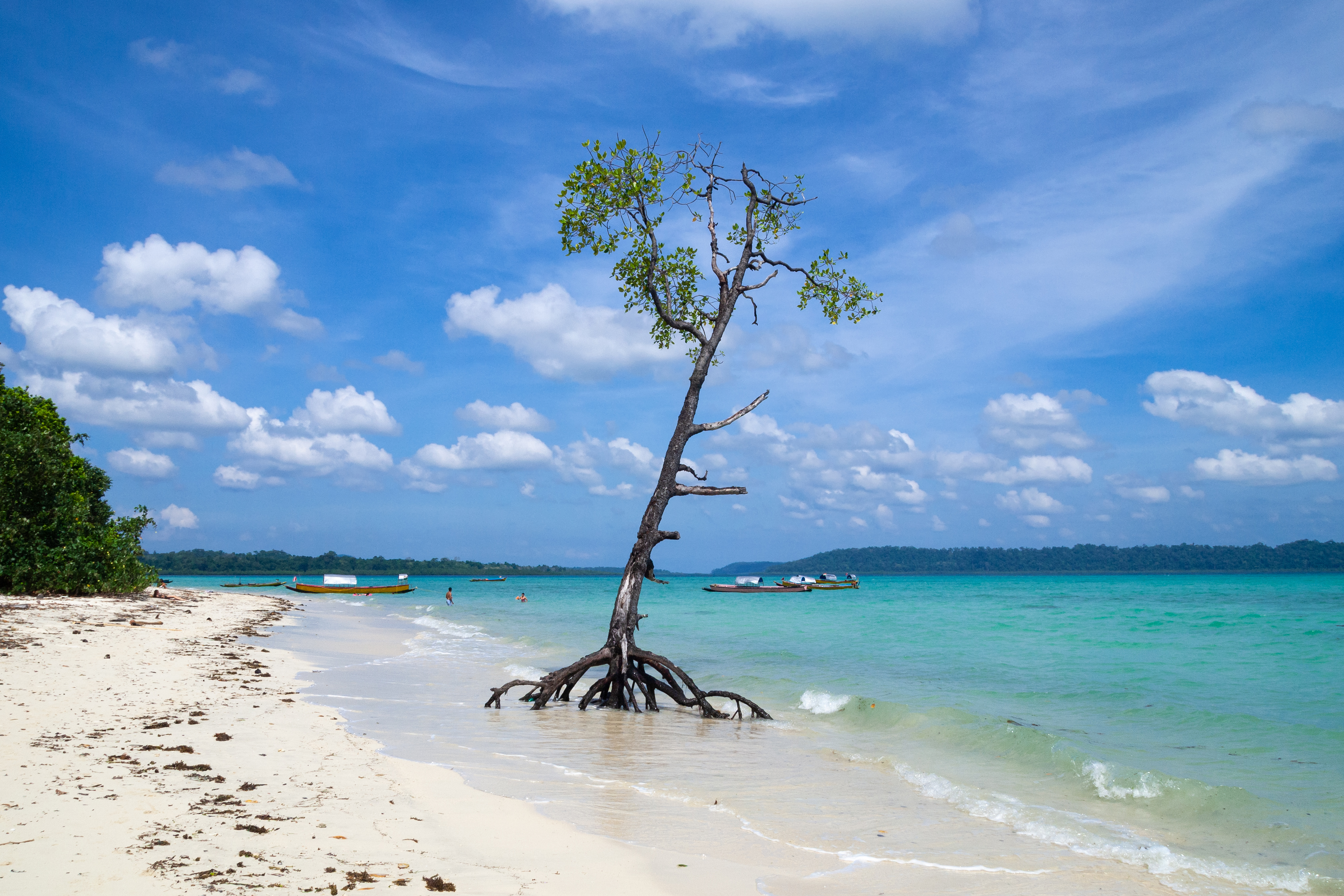
A mangrove tree on a beach on Havelock Island, the Andaman and Nicobar Islands

=== Climate ===
Köppen climate classification of India

In Köppen climate classification the regions of India are: Dry-winter, humid sub-tropical (CWa, largely the river plains of the Ganges, Brahmaputra, and Punjab rivers); Tropical savanna with dry winters (Aw, large parts of peninsular India except the Deccan Plateau and the Western Ghats); Hot semi-arid (BSh, Deccan plateau, parts of Gujarat, eastern Rajasthan, Punjab, and Western Uttar Pradesh); Hot Desert (BWh, northern Gujarat and western Rajasthan); Tropical Monsoon (Am, Western Ghats), Dry winter sub-topical highland (CWb, Himachal Pradesh, Uttarakhand, northern Bengal and upper northeast India), Cold desert (BWk, Eastern Ladakh), Tropical rainforest (Af, Sundarbans, Andaman and Nicobar Islands; Warm summer hemiboreal (Dsb, upper Himachal Pradesh and Kashmir below the Himalayas), and Ice cap in the Western Himalayas.

Monsoon weather systems play a significant role in India's climate. In turn, the Himalayas and the Tibetan Plateau play an important role in creating the South Asian monsoon, which accounts for 75 to 80 per cent of India's annual rain. In winter, the Tibetan Plateau (average altitude 4500 m) acts like a tower of ice and splits the westerlies, both the low-level and, by friction, the high-altitude jet streams. The southern branch rounds the Himalayas. Just beyond, as it slows down and creates a convergence, or backup, the air sinks, creating dry, northeasterly surface winds over India. This maintains dry, cool, Indian winters. After these winds slow down, sub-tropical westerlies guide extratropical Western disturbances from the Mediterranean Region and the Middle East across northwestern India, bringing rain for winter crops and replenishing the glaciers in the Karakorams.

By May, the sun bakes the Tibetan Plateau. Rising warm air generates a high-altitude anticyclone. This creates the Tropical Easterly Jet Stream over southern India, which draws moisture-laden southwesterly surface winds off the Indian Ocean. The Western Ghats intercept these winds, which release their moisture as orographic rain, leaving a large swath of peninsular India in the mountains' rain shadow. India's interior plains rely on monsoon depressions for their rain. These low-pressure storm systems form over the Bay of Bengal and are steered clockwise and inland by the anticyclonic jet stream. They cause summer rainfall across India from June to September. However, rainfall fluctuates in cycles, alternating between active phases characterised by heavy rain and dry breaks.

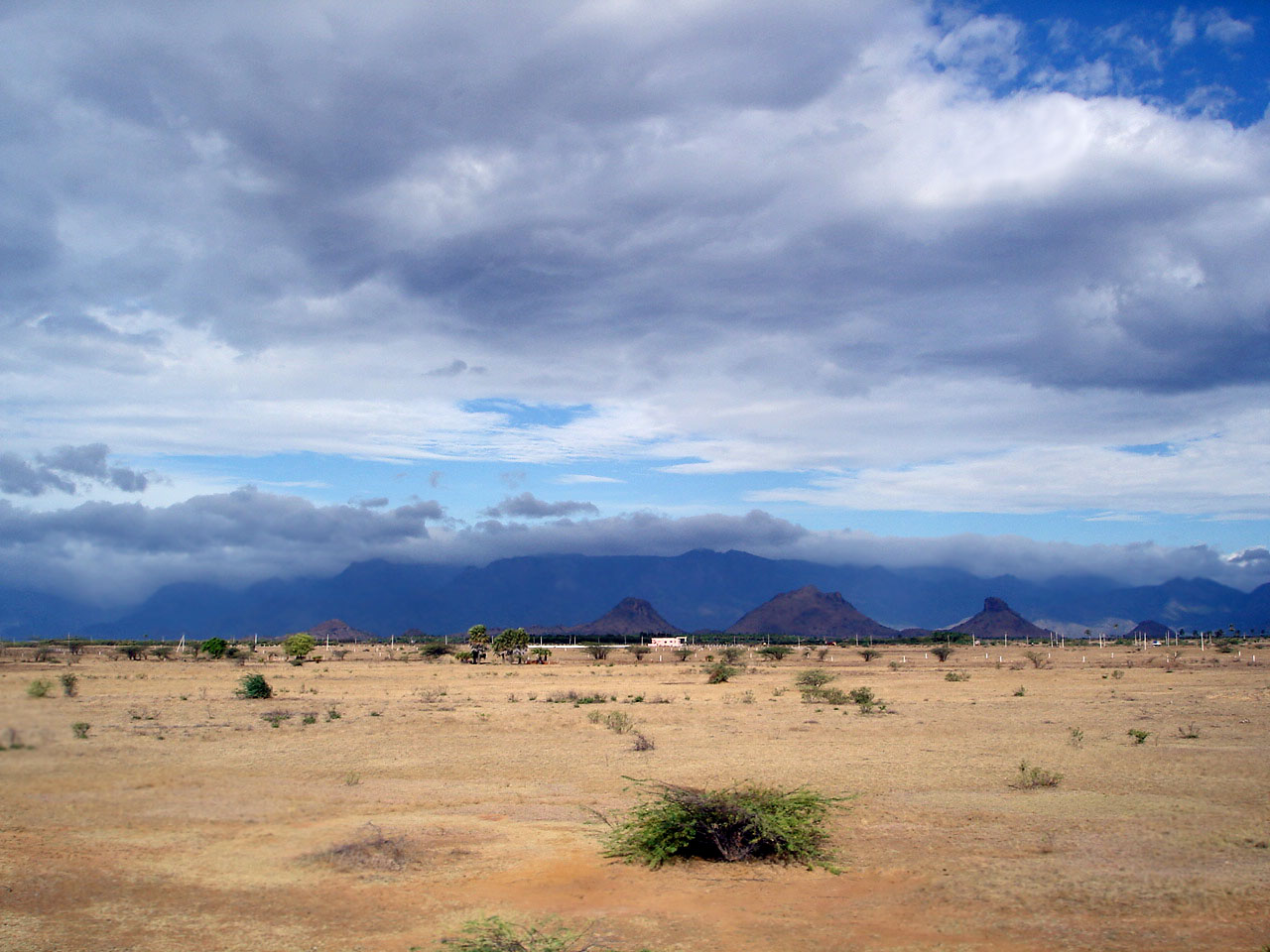
The Agasthiyamalai range, Western Ghats, as seen from the rain shadow region in Tirunelveli, Tamil Nadu

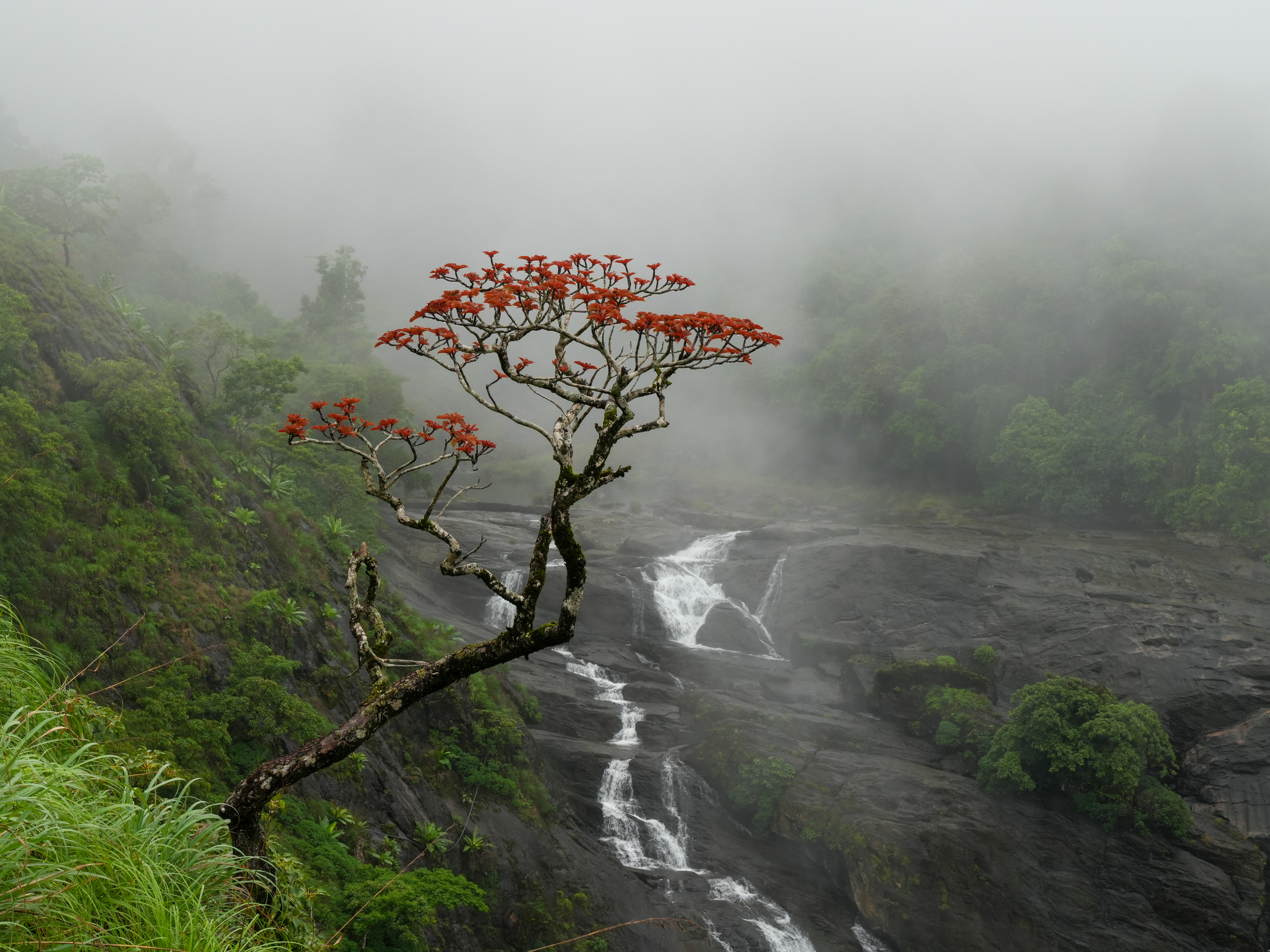
Indian coral tree in bloom in the mist of the Southwest Monsoon, Mallalli Falls, Hassan, Karnataka

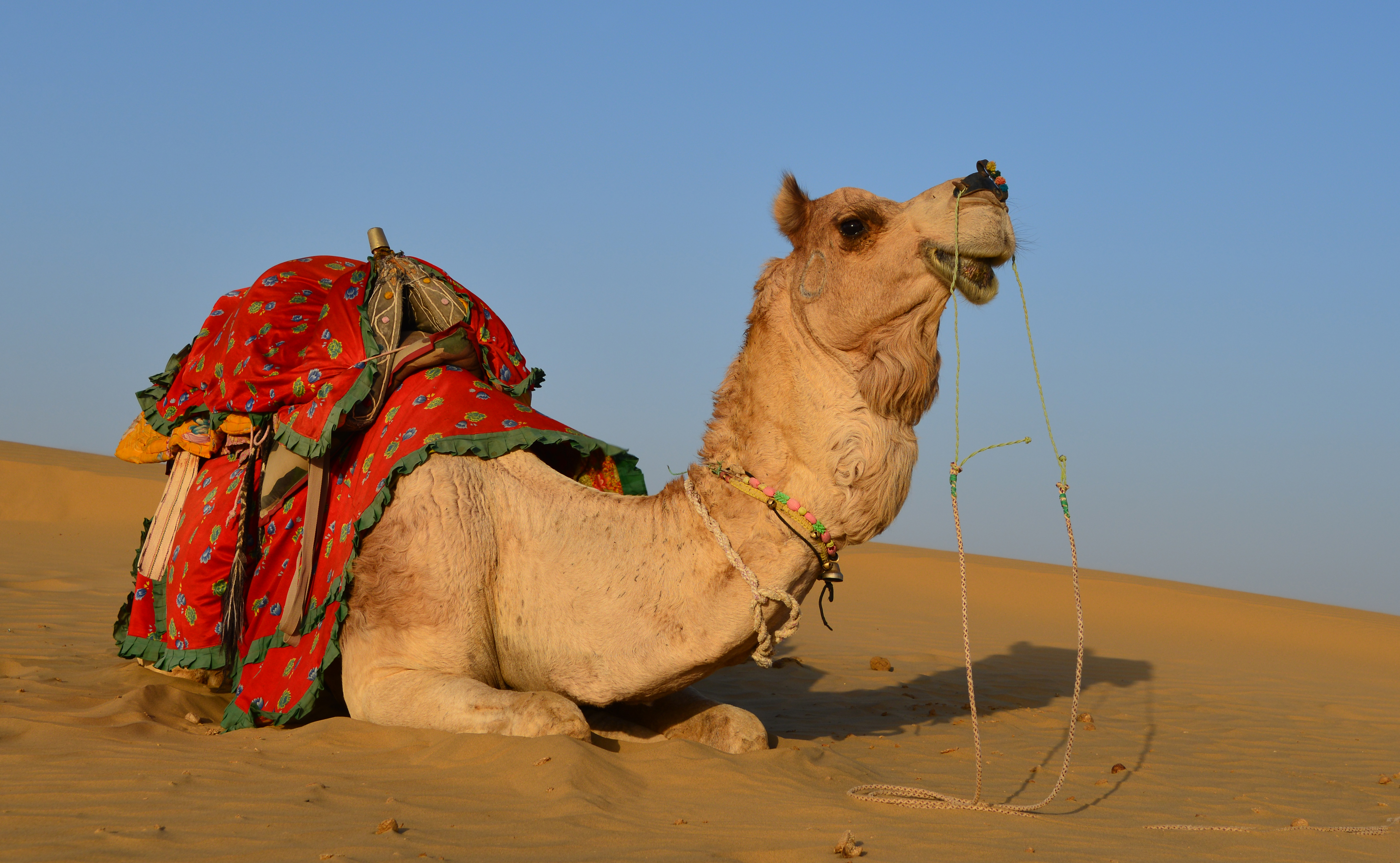
A dromedary in the Thar Desert

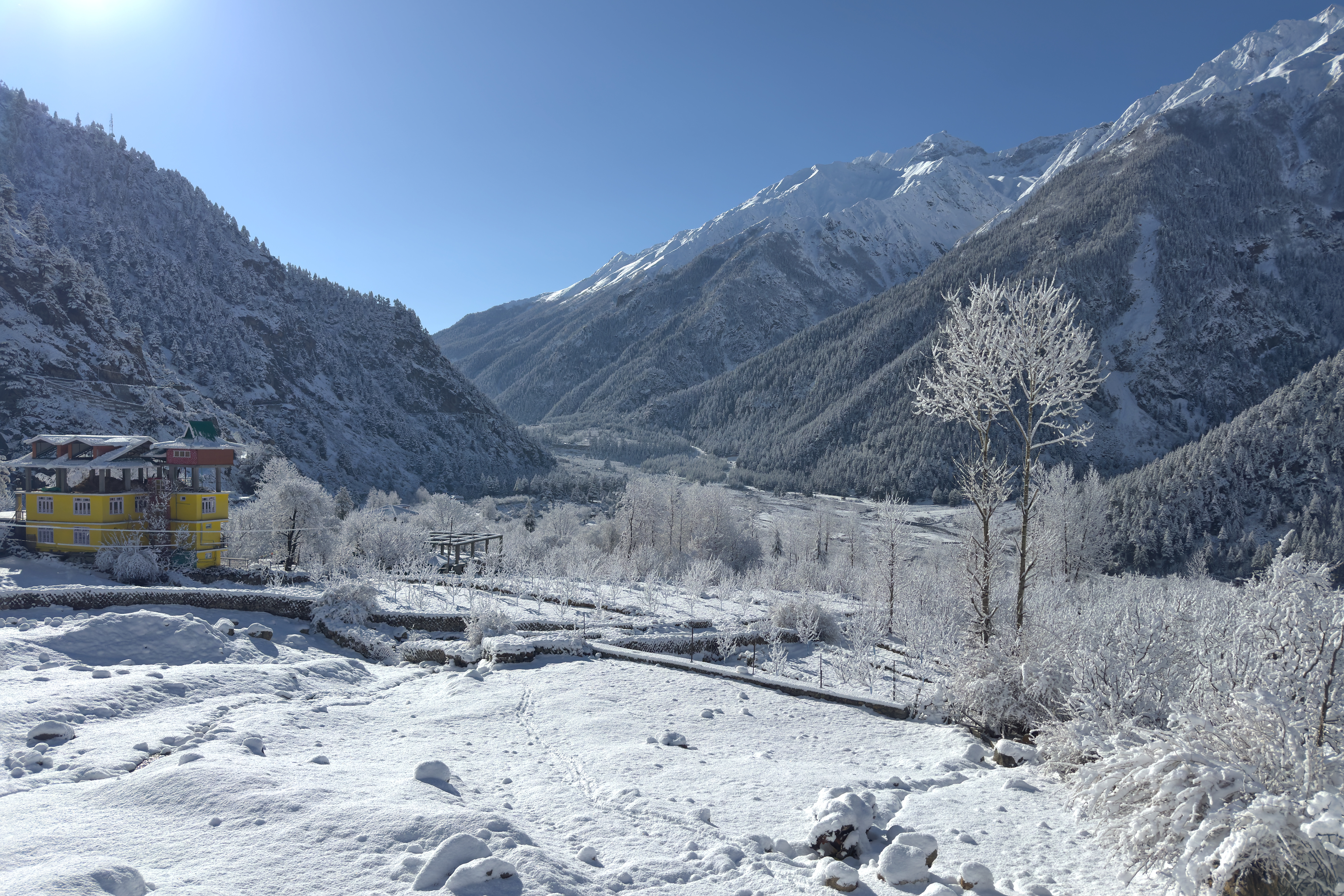
New snow in Baspa Valley, Sangla, Himachal Pradesh

=== Biodiversity ===
India is a megadiverse country, a term employed for 17 countries that host high biological diversity and contain many species indigenous, or endemic, to them. India is the habitat for 8.6% of all mammals, 13.7% of bird species, 7.9% of reptile species, 6% of amphibian species, 12.2% of fish species, and 6.0% of all flowering plant species. Fully a third of Indian plant species are endemic. India also overlaps four of the world's 34 biodiversity hotspots, or regions that display significant habitat loss in the presence of high endemism. (Note: A biodiversity hotspot is a biogeographical region which has more than 1,500 vascular plant species, but less than 30% of its primary habitat.)

India's densest forests, such as the tropical moist forest of the Andaman Islands, the Western Ghats, and Northeast India, occupy about 3% of its land area. Moderately dense forest, whose canopy density is between 40% and 70%, occupies 9.39% of India's land area. It predominates in the temperate coniferous forest of the Himalayas, the moist deciduous sal forest of eastern India, and the dry deciduous teak forest of central and southern India. India has two natural zones of thorn forest, one in the Deccan Plateau, immediately east of the Western Ghats, and the other in the western part of the Indo-Gangetic plain, now turned into rich agricultural land by irrigation, its features no longer visible. Among the Indian subcontinent's notable indigenous trees are the astringent Azadirachta indica, or neem, which is widely used in rural Indian herbal medicine, and the luxuriant Ficus religiosa, or peepul, which is displayed on the ancient seals of Mohenjo-daro, and under which the Buddha is recorded in the Pali canon to have sought enlightenment.

Many Indian species have descended from those of Gondwana, the southern supercontinent from which India separated more than 100 million years ago. India's subsequent collision with Eurasia set off a mass exchange of species. However, volcanism and climatic changes later caused the extinction of many endemic Indian forms. Still later, mammals entered India from Asia through two zoogeographic passes flanking the Himalayas. This lowered endemism among India's mammals, which stands at 12.6%, contrasting with 45.8% among reptiles and 55.8% among amphibians. Among endemics are the vulnerable hooded leaf monkey and the threatened Beddome's toad of the Western Ghats.

According to the IUCN Red List, India contains 1,021 threatened animal species—99 mammal, 82 bird, 105 reptile, 139 amphibian, 332 fish, 10 mollusk, and 254 other invertebrate—727 threatened plant species, and 4 threatened fungi species. Among them are the endangered Bengal tiger and the Ganges river dolphin. Critically endangered species include the gharial, a crocodilian; the great Indian bustard; and the Indian white-rumped vulture, which has become nearly extinct by having ingested the carrion of diclofenac-treated cattle. Before they were extensively used for agriculture and cleared for human settlement, the thorn forests of Punjab were mingled at intervals with open grasslands that were grazed by large herds of blackbuck preyed on by the Asiatic cheetah; the blackbuck, no longer extant in Punjab, is now severely endangered in India, and the cheetah is extinct. The pervasive and ecologically devastating human encroachment of recent decades has critically endangered Indian wildlife. In response, the system of national parks and protected areas, first established in 1935, was expanded substantially. In 1972, India enacted the Wildlife Protection Act and Project Tiger to safeguard crucial wilderness; the Forest Conservation Act was enacted in 1980 and amendments added in 1988. India hosts more than five hundred wildlife sanctuaries and eighteen biosphere reserves, four of which are part of the World Network of Biosphere Reserves; its eighty-nine wetlands are registered under the Ramsar Convention.

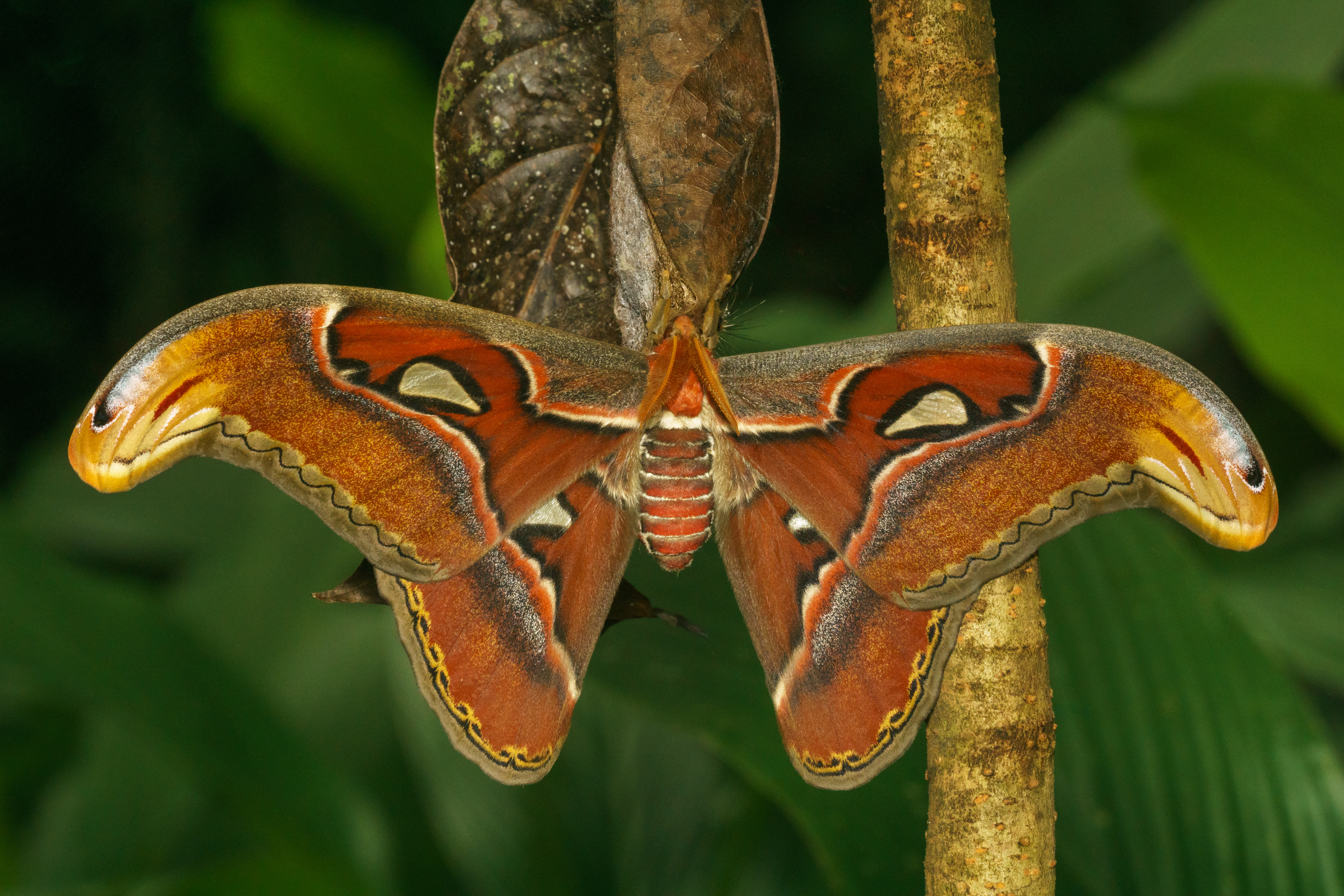
An Attacus taprobanis moth from Kadavoor, Kerala

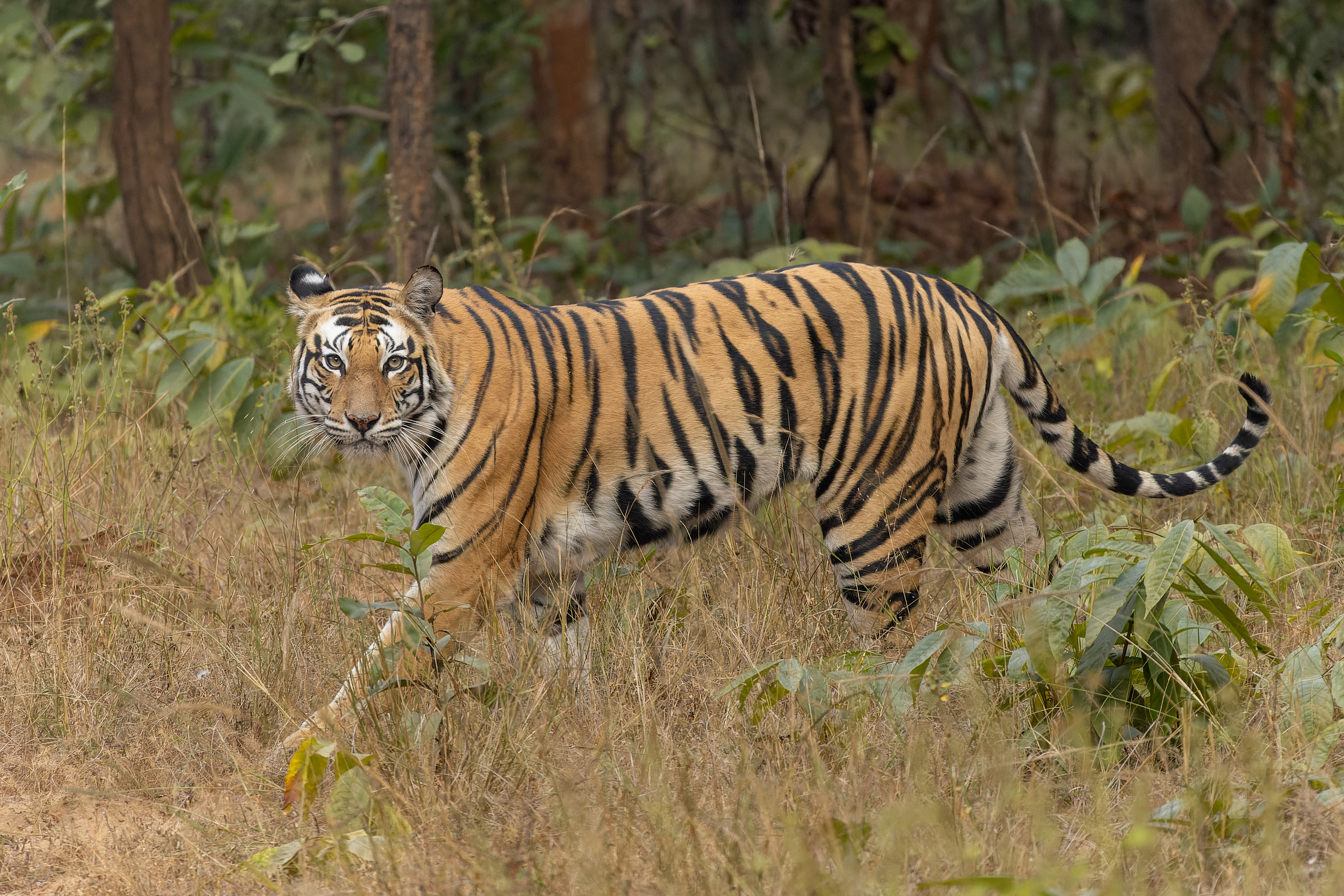
India has the majority of the world's wild tigers, approximately 3,170 in 2022.

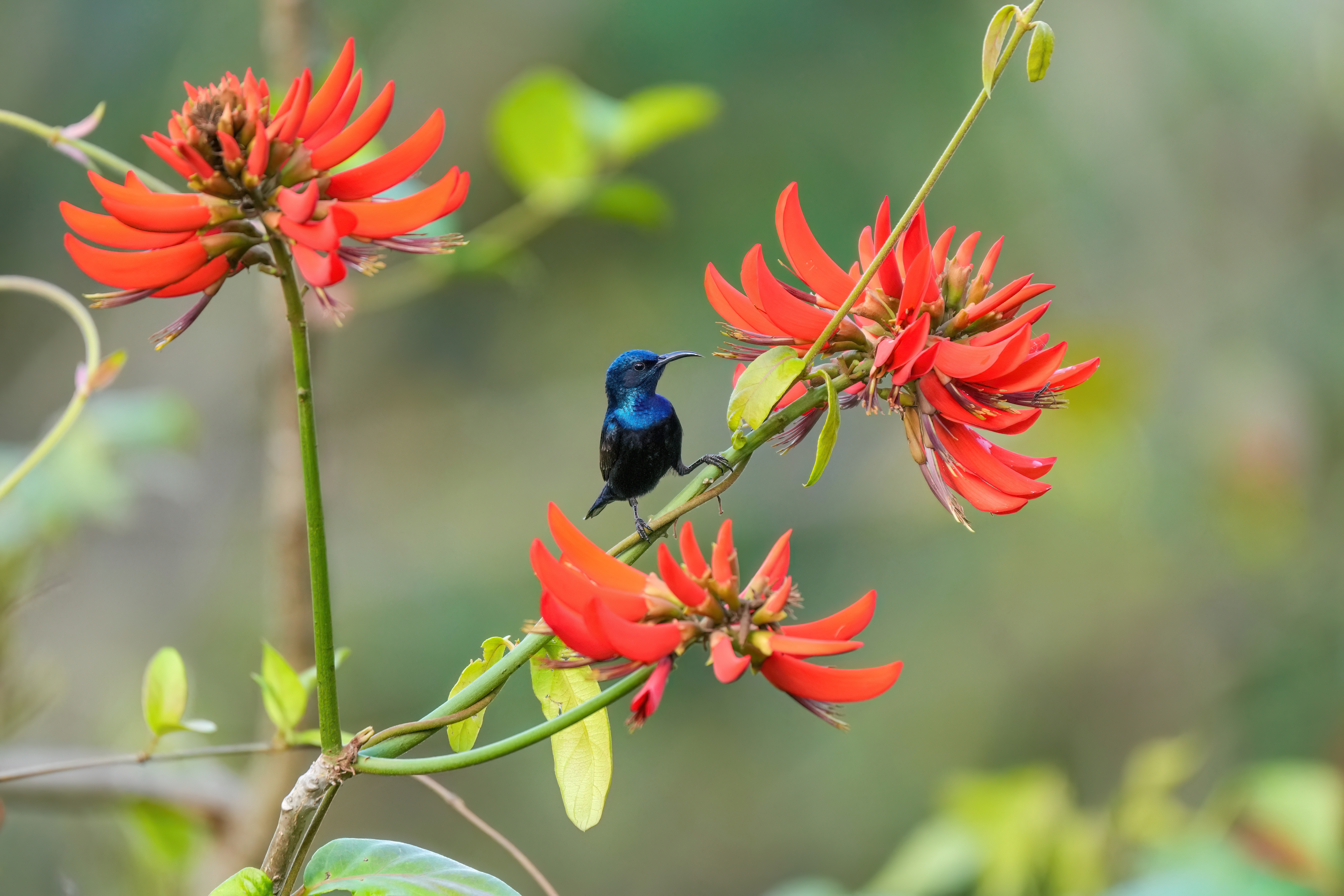
A purple sunbird perched on an Indian coral tree, Jim Corbett National Park, Uttarakhand

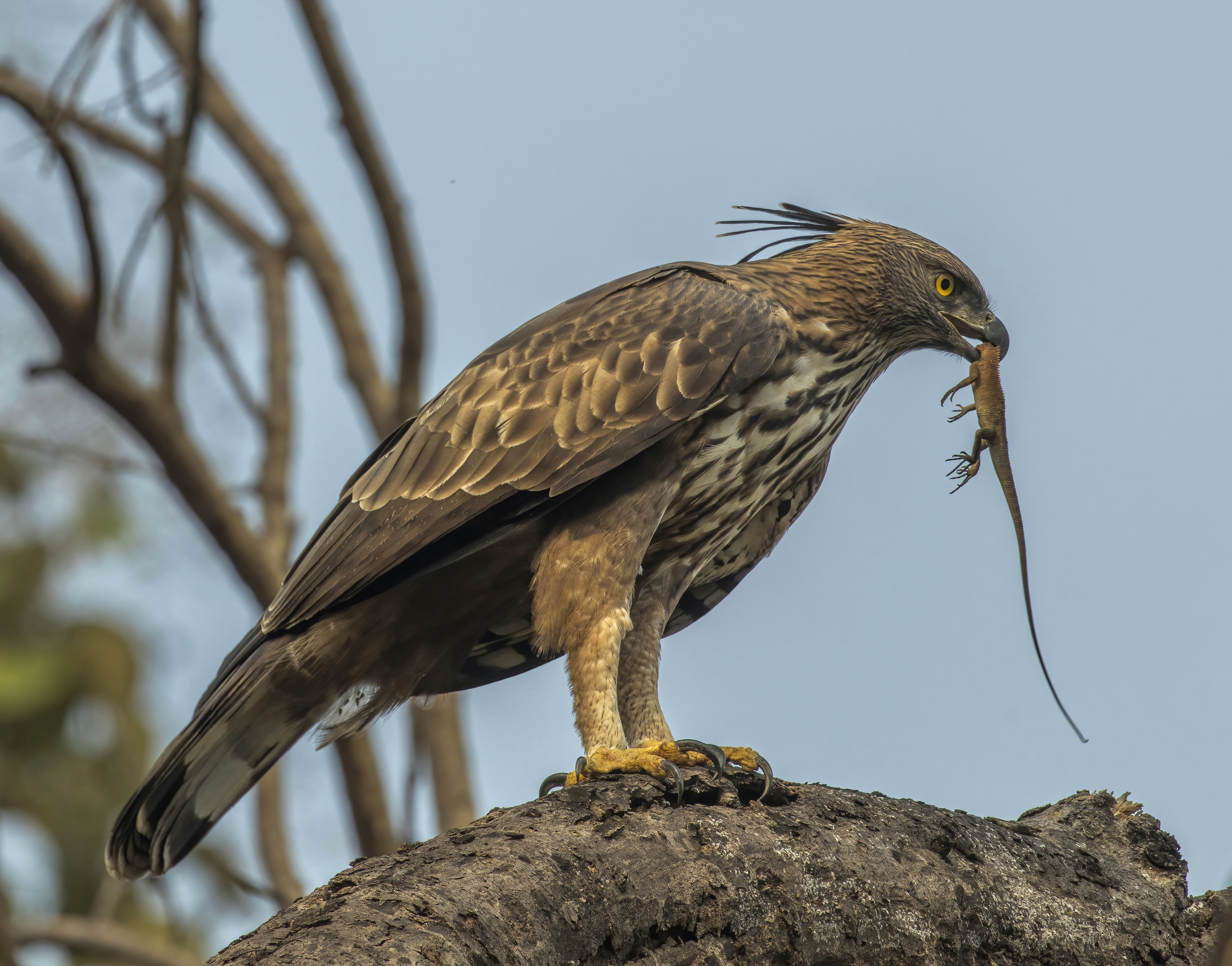
A Crested hawk-eagle with an Indian garden lizard in Satpura National Park, Madhya Pradesh

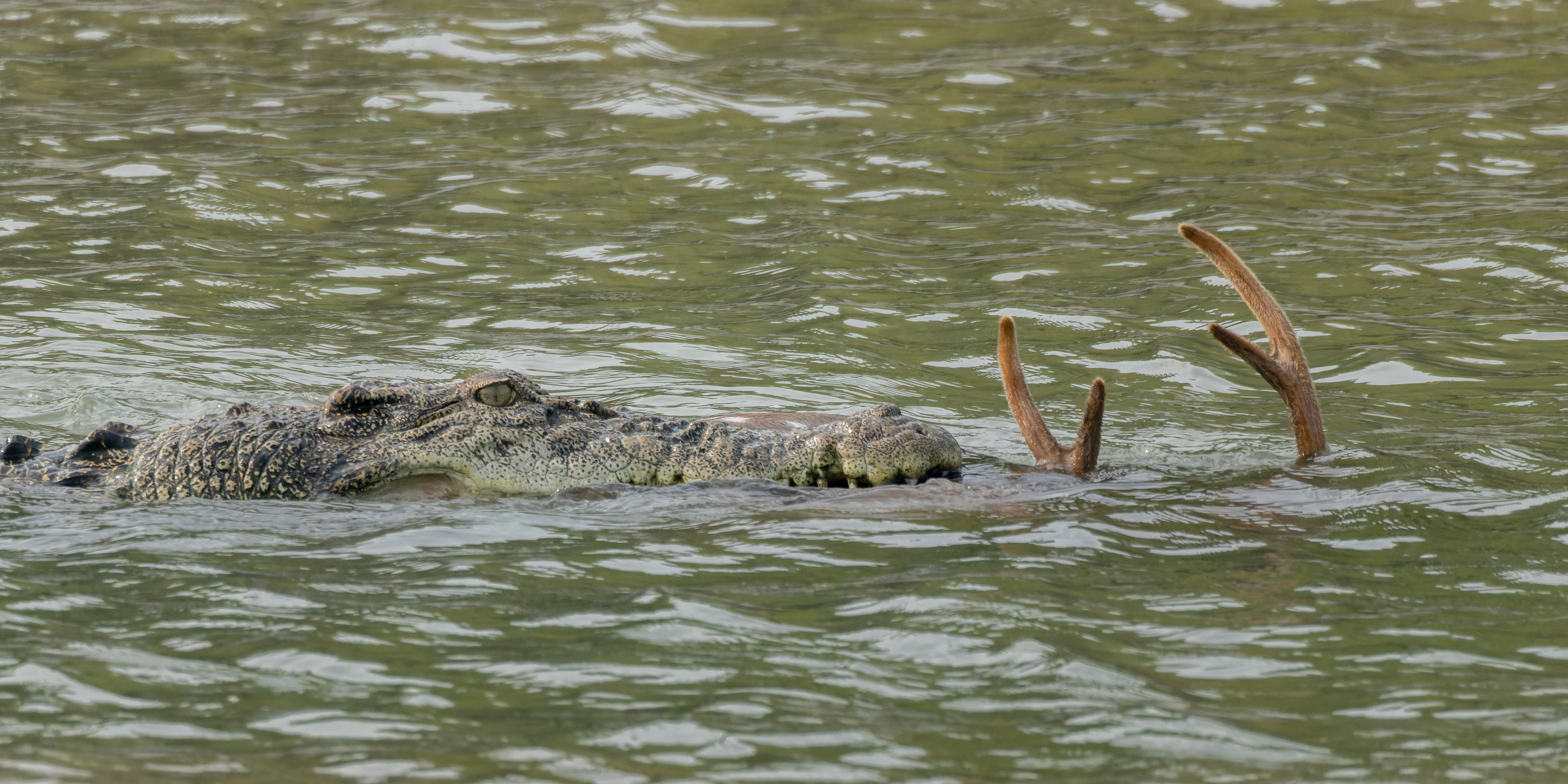
Saltwater crocodile in Sundarbans National Park, West Bengal

== Government and politics ==
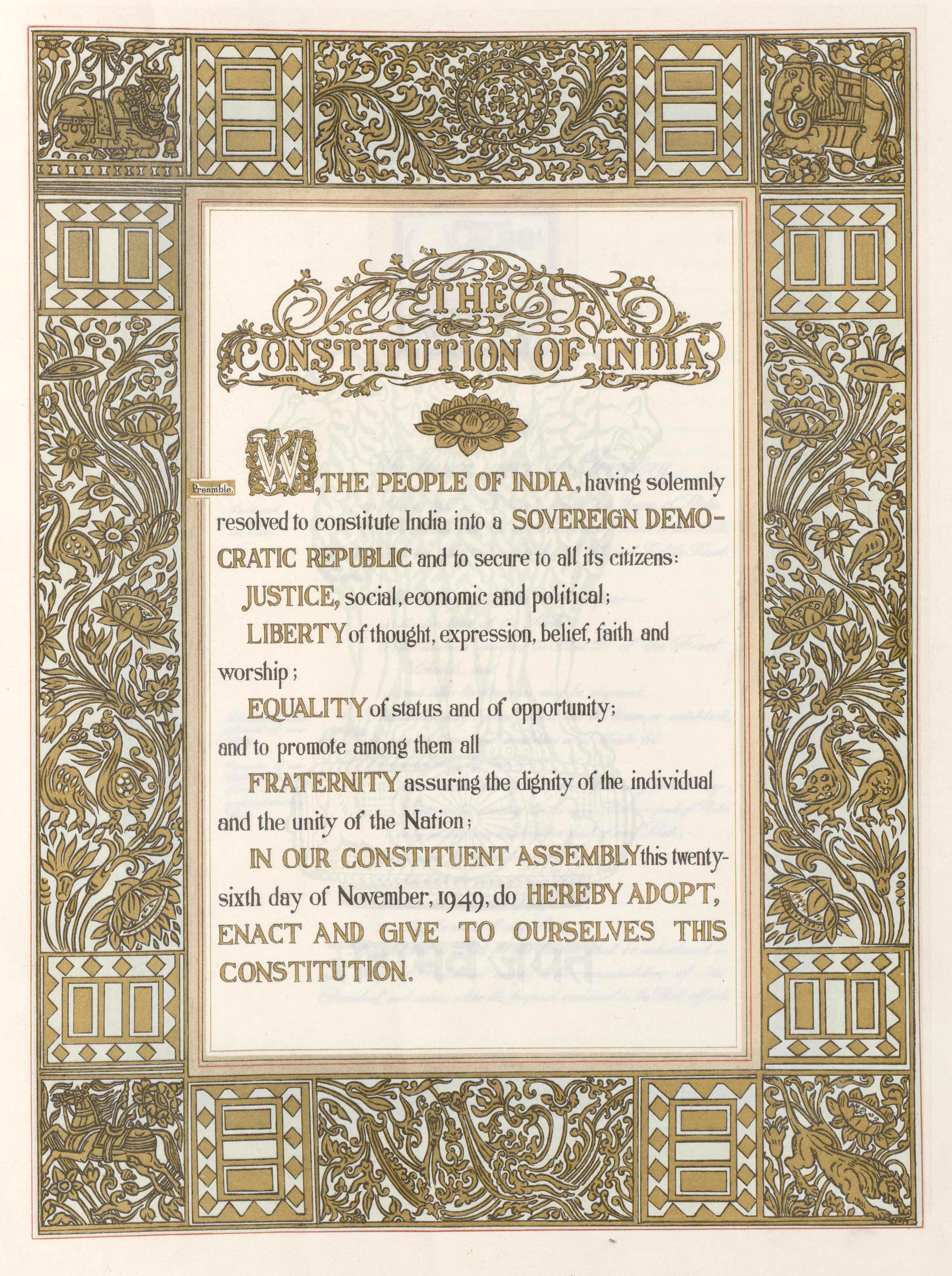
The original preamble of the Constitution of India in 1950. In 1976, during the tenure of Indian Prime Minister Indira Gandhi, the first sentence was changed to "Sovereign Socialist Secular Democratic Republic".

Constitution: The Constitution of India was drafted by the Constituent Assembly of India between 1946 and 1949, despite the political disruptions of the Partition. The Government of India Act 1935 was used as a model and framework. Long passages from the Act are included. The Indian Constitution merges the opposing principles of federalism, which disperses political authority, and parliamentarianism, which centralises legislative power. (Note: The framers adopted this dual framework to accommodate the nation's vast diversity, the legacy of colonial rule, and its fragmented regional history.) The federal structure features a strong central government that controls defence, foreign affairs, railways, ports, and currency. The President, the constitutional head of state, has reserve powers for taking over the administration of a state. The Constitution also includes features not found in the 1935 Act. The definition of fundamental rights is based on the Constitution of the United States, and the constitutional directives, or goals of endeavour, are based on the Constitution of Ireland. Among two Constitutional institutions are the Supreme Court of India and the Election Commission. The Constitution also recommends the panchayat (village committees). Untouchability is illegal (Article 17) and caste distinctions are derecognised (Articles 15(2) and 16(2)). On 26 January 1950, the promulgation of the Indian Constitution transformed India into a republic within the Commonwealth of Nations.

Citizenship: During Constituent Assembly debates, India's founders strongly preferred jus soli, or birthright citizenship. They viewed birth on the soil as a deeply democratic principle, contrasting it sharply with jus sanguinis—descent-based citizenship—which they rejected as racial and outdated. While India's Constitution originally carved out exceptions for those who migrated to India after Partition, the Citizenship Act of 1955 formally established birthplace as the foundation of Indian citizenship.

This foundation began to shift in the 1980s, when ethnic and political unrest in the northeastern state of Assam targeted Bengali-speaking migrants. The resulting legislative amendments steadily eroded jus soli. India's new citizenship laws increasingly favour bloodline over birthplace, erecting steep legal obstacles for new or marginalised groups seeking to achieve substantive equality.

Houses of Parliament: The Lok Sabha, India's lower house of parliament, consists of 543 members directly elected by universal suffrage, with specific seats reserved to guarantee fair representation for Scheduled Castes and Scheduled Tribes. However, its legislative productivity has steadily waned over the decades; the average number of annual working days dropped from 121 in the 1950s to just 68 between 2000 and 2023, a decline compounded by rising disruptive protests during sessions.

The Rajya Sabha, India's upper house, serves as a federal chamber whose members are chosen by state legislatures under a system that weights representation by population while ensuring a baseline for smaller regions. Yet, historical data reveals that most members serve only a single term. This high turnover suggests that party leadership often uses these federal seats as instruments of political patronage to reward loyalty rather than build long-term legislative expertise.

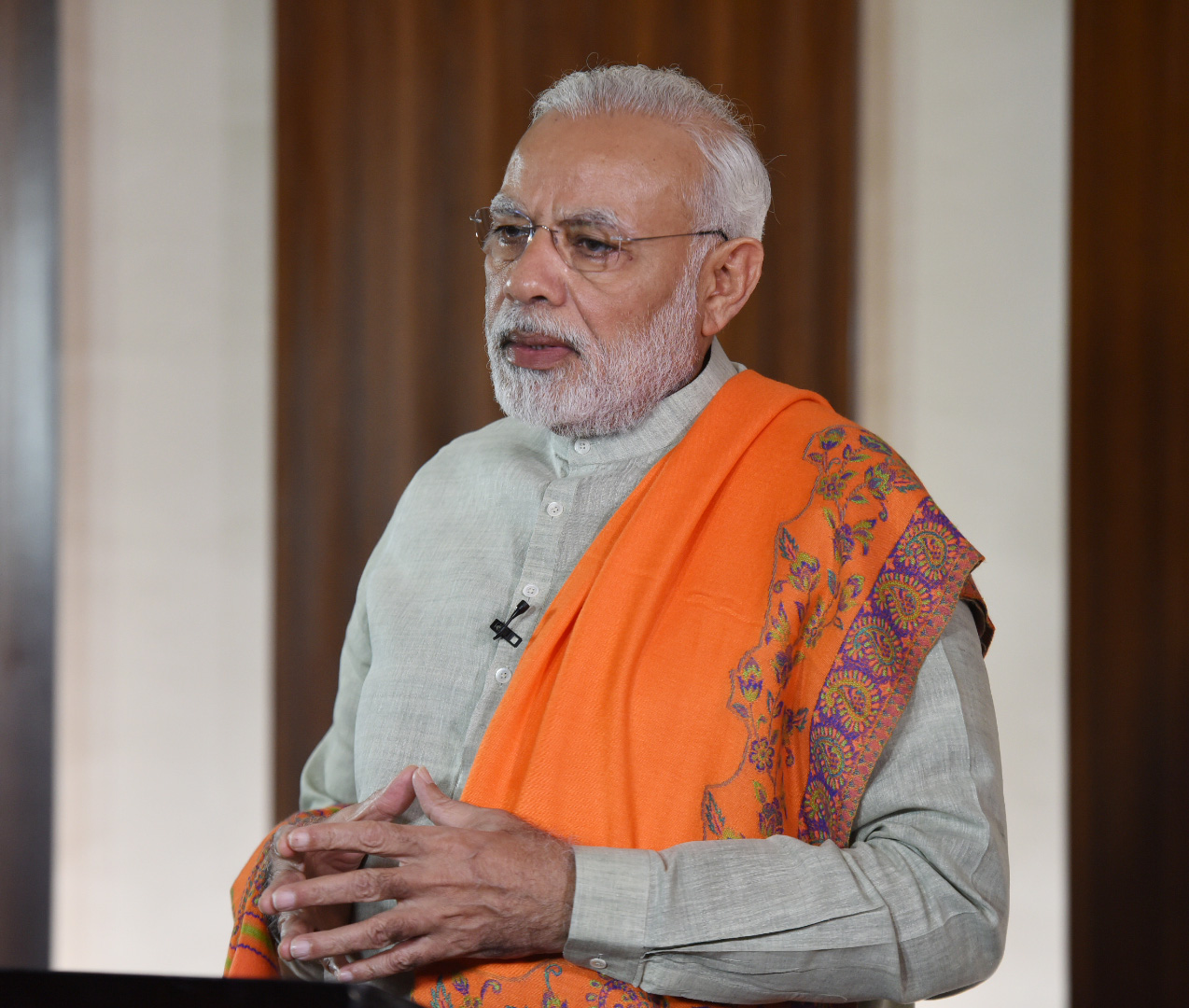
Narendra Modi has been India's Prime Minister since 2014.

Cabinet: Officially known in India as the Union Council of Ministers, the Cabinet is the principal institution of governance. It is traditionally defined by three principles: collective responsibility, political homogeneity, and a prime minister who acts as first among equals. Jawaharlal Nehru's early administrations, from 1946 until the mid-1950s, prominently featured confident, independent-minded ministers. (Note: Figures like Deputy Prime Minister Sardar Patel, Education Minister Maulana Azad, Defence Minister Baldev Singh, and Law Minister B.R. Ambedkar (who chaired the Constitution-drafting committee) were unafraid to express dissenting views.) However, after the 1957 election, the Congress Party's overwhelming mandate shifted governance toward a centralised, prime-ministerial model. (Note: India's humiliating defeat in the 1962 India-China War has been blamed on a lack of balancing political advice.)

After Nehru's death in 1964, during Lal Bahadur Shastri's brief tenure, there was a partial swing back to cabinet-based governance. Yet by 1969, under Indira Gandhi, the central government operated largely in the prime minister's shadow. This extreme centralisation ultimately led to decisions like the Emergency—a suspension of India's civil liberties from 1975 to 1977. In contrast, the subsequent Janata Party administration of Morarji Desai (1977–1979) swung back toward a cabinet-driven model, though it lacked ideological cohesion. Following Indira Gandhi's assassination in 1984, Rajiv Gandhi's administration was marked by an overwhelming legislative majority that allowed the prime minister to reshuffle cabinet portfolios at will.

Between 1989 and 2014, India experienced eleven coalition cabinets where the ideal of political homogeneity was severely tested by competing party demands. During this era, alliance partners bargained for specific portfolios and dictated their own appointments, significantly weakening the prime minister's authority. Only three prime ministers served a full five-year term or more during this volatile period: P.V. Narasimha Rao (1991–1996), Atal Bihari Vajpayee (1999–2004), and Manmohan Singh (2004–2014). (Note: During Singh’s tenure, a dual power structure emerged, splitting decision-making between the Prime Minister and Congress Party Chairperson Sonia Gandhi.) More recently, the National Democratic Alliance majorities in 2014 and 2019 have once again consolidated substantial authority in the hands of the prime minister, Narendra Modi.

Political parties: Since the mid-1980s—marking the second half of India's postcolonial history—the Bharatiya Janata Party, or BJP, has grown from a marginal party into a political giant. Scholars interpret this rapid expansion as a form of hegemony where Hindu nationalism has largely sidelined traditional secularism in India. Along with its ideological draw, the party's deep pockets and heavy hand on the mainstream media and watchdogs—like the Supreme Court and the Election Commission—have hemmed in opposition parties. This political hold relies largely on Narendra Modi's top-down leadership and his broad popularity with Indian voters.

Unlike the BJP, the Congress Party relied on a middle-of-the-road platform and a loose organisation, but it has struggled to fit a changing, right-leaning voter base. The Congress Party shifts between compromising its beliefs and directly attacking Hindutva; this has blocked its path to winning back its traditional civic nationalism. Fearing voter backlash, Congress leaders have largely avoided a united stand for secularism and social justice.

From the late 1980s to 2014, local or regional parties wielded heavy clout nationwide by anchoring coalition governments and holding the keys to making or breaking central rule. During this period of fractured politics, breakaway groups from national parties like Congress and the Janata Dal ruled most Indian states. (Note: However, the rise of back-to-back single-party majorities in the Lok Sabha since 2014 has sharply cut the regional parties' nationwide leverage and cabinet seats.) While the ruling party still reaches out to local groups to pass laws in the upper house, these homegrown parties no longer hold the power to shake or topple the central government. (Note: Among India's major regional parties are: Dravida Munnetra Kazhagam (DMK), Telugu Desam Party (TDP), Telugu Desam Party (YSRCP), and Bharat Rashtra Samithi (BRS) in South India; All India Trinamool Congress (TMC), Biju Janata Dal (BJK), Janata Dal (United) (JD(U)), and Rashtriya Janata Dal (RJD) in East and Northeast India; and Bahujan Samaj Party (BSP), Samajwadi Party (SP), Shiv Sena, Nationalist Congress Party (NCP), Aam Aadmi Party (AAP), Shiromani Akali Dal (SAD), Jammu & Kashmir National Conference (JKNC) and the Jammu and Kashmir Peoples Democratic Party (JKPDP) in western and northern India.)

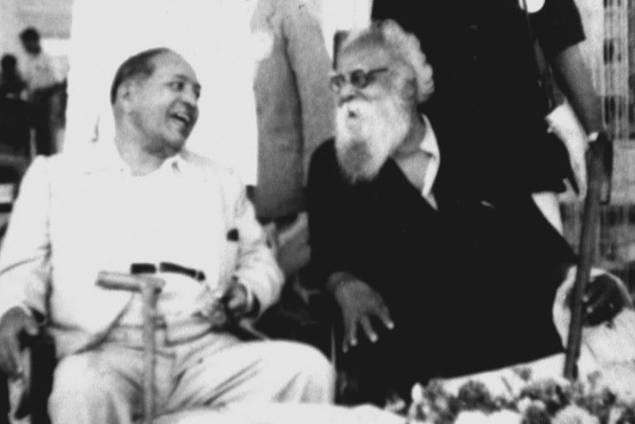
B. R. Ambedkar, left, the chairman of the drafting committee of India's constitution, and Periyar, who founded the Self-Respect Movement in Tamil Nadu and eventually the Dravidar Kazhagam, the first major political party of South India, sharing a light moment at a Buddhist conference in Rangoon, Myanmar, in 1954

Caste politics: After independence, the power of the vote gradually shifted local power, beginning with the rise of intermediate agrarian castes that displaced traditional forward castes across southern and western India. In the late 1960s and 1970s, this social upheaval spread northward, causing caste-driven rivalries and political divides in states like Bihar and Uttar Pradesh. The implementation of the Mandal Commission recommendations in 1990 led to this movement facing an increasingly assertive and independent Dalit political movement.

Women in politics: Women's representation in India's Lok Sabha and state assemblies remains stubbornly low, leaving the nation well behind the global average. (Note: Over the past two decades, India has steadily slipped in international parliamentary rankings because it lacks mandatory quotas.) Political parties act as powerful gatekeepers; they rarely select female candidates, ensuring that women have never made up more than ten per cent of the ballot in any national election. While women tend to win at higher rates when actually nominated, their presence in the lower house has plateaued at just 14 per cent, with state-level numbers sinking even lower.

Muslim representation: The 1947 partition of the subcontinent shattered the geographic and political weight of Indian Muslims. Overnight, they shifted from a powerful political bloc with clear majorities in two vast regions—the Punjab and Bengal—to a scattered minority. (Note: Today, the bulk of India's Muslim population is concentrated in just three states—Uttar Pradesh, Bihar, and West Bengal—with sizeable pockets in Assam, Telangana, and Kerala, and majorities only in the Lakshadweep Islands and Jammu & Kashmir.) Because they are so widely dispersed, Muslims are easily outnumbered in almost every state legislature. While they make up over 14 per cent of India's population, their presence in Parliament remains tokenised. In the 2024 general election, they won a near-historic low of 4.4 per cent, or 24 seats in the Lok Sabha This is not a recent shift; since Independence, Muslim representation has consistently plateaued near the 5 per cent mark, locking the community into a permanent state of political marginalisation.

State coercion and political violence: While India remains a democratic society, successive governments have relied on state coercion, pushing through unilateral policies with minimal public input. This heavy-handedness is backed by a politicised and unaccountable police force that routinely uses preventive detention laws to silence critics of the ruling regime. Political violence in India ranges from localised lynchings and armed campaign clashes to deep-seated borderland insurgencies. Among these, only the conflicts in Kashmir and the Northeast have historically commanded sustained national attention. Still, they remain politically isolated compared to the explosive violence that erupts within state elections. In states like Kerala and West Bengal, election campaigns are openly militarised; mainstream parties run permanent enforcement wings and goon networks as standard parts of their daily party machines. Elsewhere, especially in the Hindi Belt, politicians deliberately trigger religious riots in the months leading up to a vote.

In recent years, India has experienced democratic erosion, in which a combination of institutional passivity, negligence, and political meddling has crippled the ability of the Supreme Court, the Election Commission, and other federal agencies to restrain an executive branch and a ruling party partial to majoritarian Hindu nationalism.

=== Administrative divisions ===
A clickable map of the 28 states and 8 union territories of India

India is a federal union comprising 28 states and 8 union territories. All states, as well as the union territories of Jammu and Kashmir, Puducherry and the National Capital Territory of Delhi, have elected legislatures and governments following the Westminster system. The remaining five union territories are directly ruled by the central government through appointed administrators. In 1956, under the States Reorganisation Act, states were reorganised on a linguistic basis. Over a quarter of a million local government bodies operate at the city, town, district, block, and village levels.

States

- Andhra Pradesh
- Arunachal Pradesh
- Assam
- Bihar
- Chhattisgarh
- Goa
- Gujarat
- Haryana
- Himachal Pradesh
- Jharkhand
- Karnataka
- Kerala
- Madhya Pradesh
- Maharashtra
- Manipur
- Meghalaya
- Mizoram
- Nagaland
- Odisha
- Punjab
- Rajasthan
- Sikkim
- Tamil Nadu
- Telangana
- Tripura
- Uttar Pradesh
- Uttarakhand
- West Bengal

Union territories

- Andaman and Nicobar Islands
- Chandigarh
- Dadra and Nagar Haveli and Daman and Diu
- Jammu and Kashmir
- Ladakh
- Lakshadweep
- National Capital Territory of Delhi
- Puducherry

=== Foreign and military policy ===
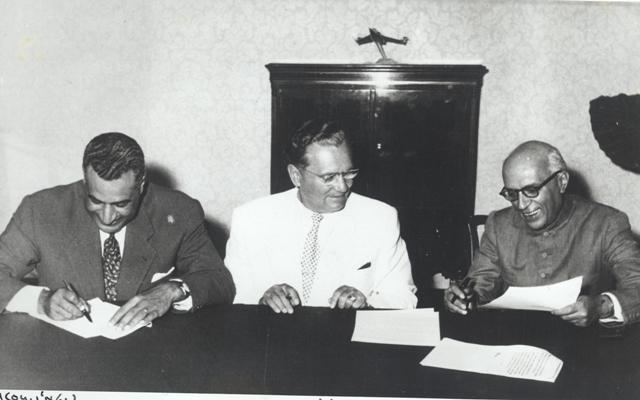
In the 1950s and 60s, India played a pivotal role in the Non-Aligned Movement. From left to right: Gamal Abdel Nasser of the United Arab Republic (now Egypt), Josip Broz Tito of Yugoslavia and Jawaharlal Nehru in Belgrade, September 1961.

India's foreign policy history is divided into four distinct periods, the first beginning with idealism at independence and ending with the 1962 Sino-Indian border war. The second phase, lasting until the end of the Cold War, maintained traditional non-aligned rhetoric but shifted toward a realistic approach through a strategic and military alignment with the Soviet Union. The collapse of the Soviet bloc in 1991 began a third period, forcing policymakers to re-evaluate the nation's external strategy in a newly unipolar world. The fourth and current phase began in 2014 under Prime Minister Narendra Modi, who has deliberately sought to pivot away from his predecessors' intellectual legacy. Despite a lack of prior diplomatic background, the current leadership has pursued a highly active and pragmatic foreign policy, particularly in engaging global powers and the Middle Eastern countries, including Israel. This realism initially extended to China, where early diplomatic outreach persisted despite localised border incursions. However, a deadly military clash in the Galwan Valley in 2020 forced India to abandon a stable partnership with China. The current administration has also shown little interest in the Non-Aligned Movement, breaking with past conventions by skipping multiple summits. Nevertheless, strategic autonomy remains central to national doctrine, as shown by the refusal to condemn the Russian invasion of Ukraine.

India remains acutely sensitive to its land borders, viewing both Pakistan and China as persistent threats that utilise small-scale territorial land grabs to alter the status quo. To counter a simultaneous two-front war, India dedicates most of its defence resources and personnel to land defence. This prioritisation limits the funding available for the Indian Navy to project maritime power across the broader Indo-Pacific region. India's nuclear warhead inventory remains officially classified, but its steady accumulation of fissile material gives it the capacity to match the arsenal sizes of major nuclear powers by the end of the 2020s.

== Economy ==
After independence in 1947, India shifted from the colonial economic model to a focus on industrialisation and poverty reduction. This transition brought a large expansion of government authority. Government spending as a share of gross domestic product (GDP) increased from 3 to 5 per cent in 1931 to 22 per cent by 1981. Public administration and state-owned enterprises became major employers. To manage this market intervention, India developed—during the 1950s—a comprehensive, federally managed statistical system to conduct large-scale sample surveys for monitoring and assessing living standards or effects of interventions. The Indian state utilised fiscal policy and international assistance to fund capital-intensive industrialisation and subsidise basic goods such as food, fertilisers, and electric power. However, by the 1970s, this heavy public spending became unsustainable. Domestic economic growth slowed, leading to a balance-of-payments crisis, whereas government spending flattened around 28–30 per cent of GDP. Government-led planning yielded mixed results. Many of India's big economic changes were not planned by government bureaucrats. Thus, the 1970s Green Revolution, mass labour migration to the Middle East, and a garment-industry boom all emerged from global market forces and non-state actors; the government simply adapted to them after they were underway.

A major shift occurred during the 1990s as India rejoined the global economy. The Indian government reduced import tariffs and enacted pro-market reforms. This phase was initially supported by worker remittances from abroad and a sharp rise in exports of labour-intensive goods like textiles. Subsequently service and software exports accelerated as global communication costs fell. Overall, private business investment rose significantly as the Indian government shifted its economic priorities. By the mid-2010s, India's economy was rapidly growing. It led to gains in poverty reduction, increased national tax collection, and a surge in private investment. As the Indian government methodically withdrew from direct investment in industry, it simultaneously increased public spending on vital infrastructure projects to keep pace with accelerating urbanisation. This economic opening also diversified the domestic economy. New industries emerged, most notably in information technology services; the national judicial infrastructure slowly adapted. However, growth was accompanied by widening income gaps, with some data showing only limited gains in overall welfare and everyday quality of life. Moreover, rapid development has exerted accelerated pressure on the environment. In response, activist political movements emerged to resist environmental degradation.

Construction work during the monsoon, Ooty Municipal Market, Ootacamund, Tamil Nadu, August 2025

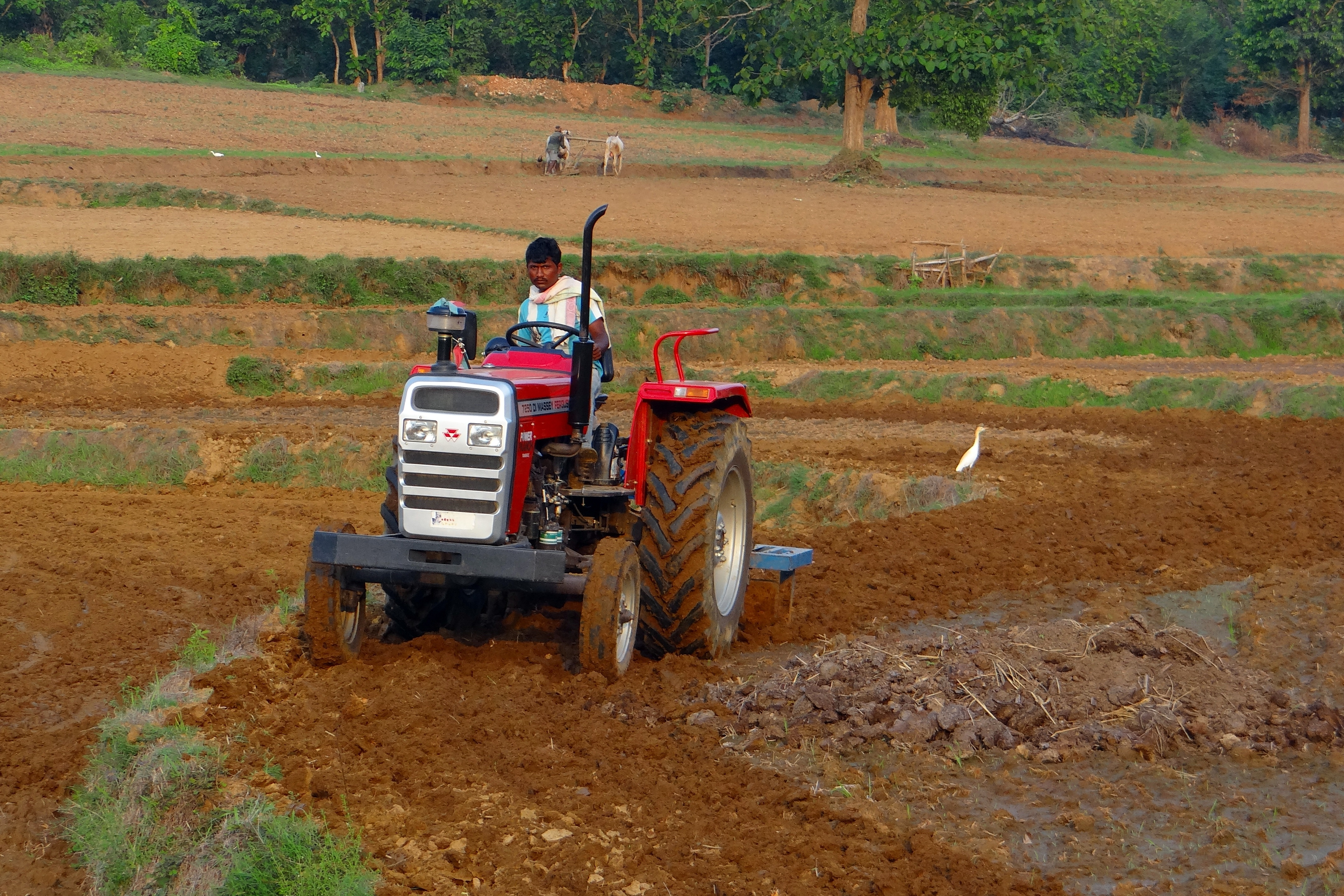
In 2019, 43% of India's total workforce was employed in agriculture.

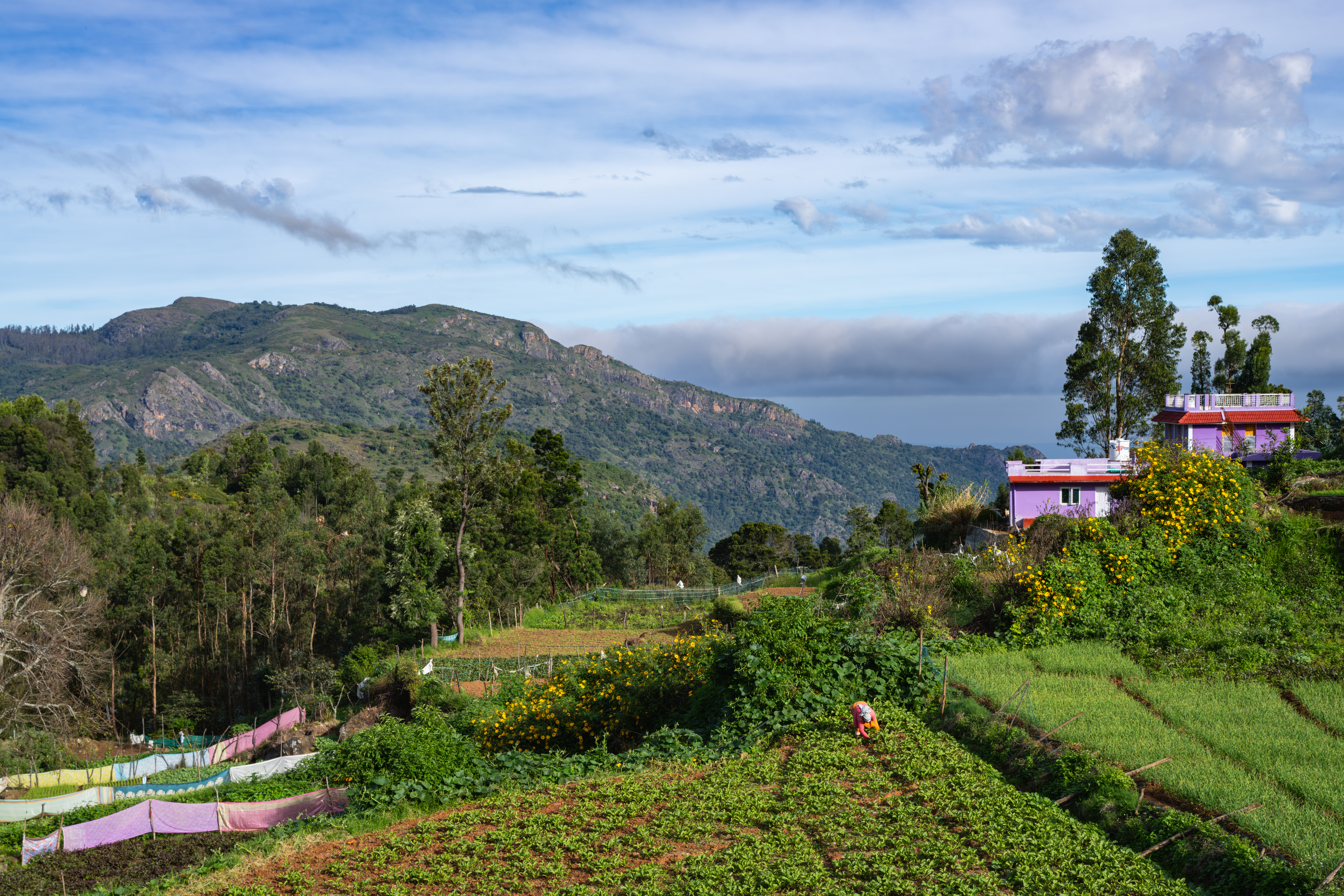
A woman growing radish in the foreground and garlic to the right in a village in the Nilgiris, Tamil Nadu. In 2019, 55% of India's female workforce was employed in agriculture.

A professional Unity game engine training programme at the Central Research and Training Laboratory, National Council of Science Museums, Kolkata, in March 2018

=== Industries ===
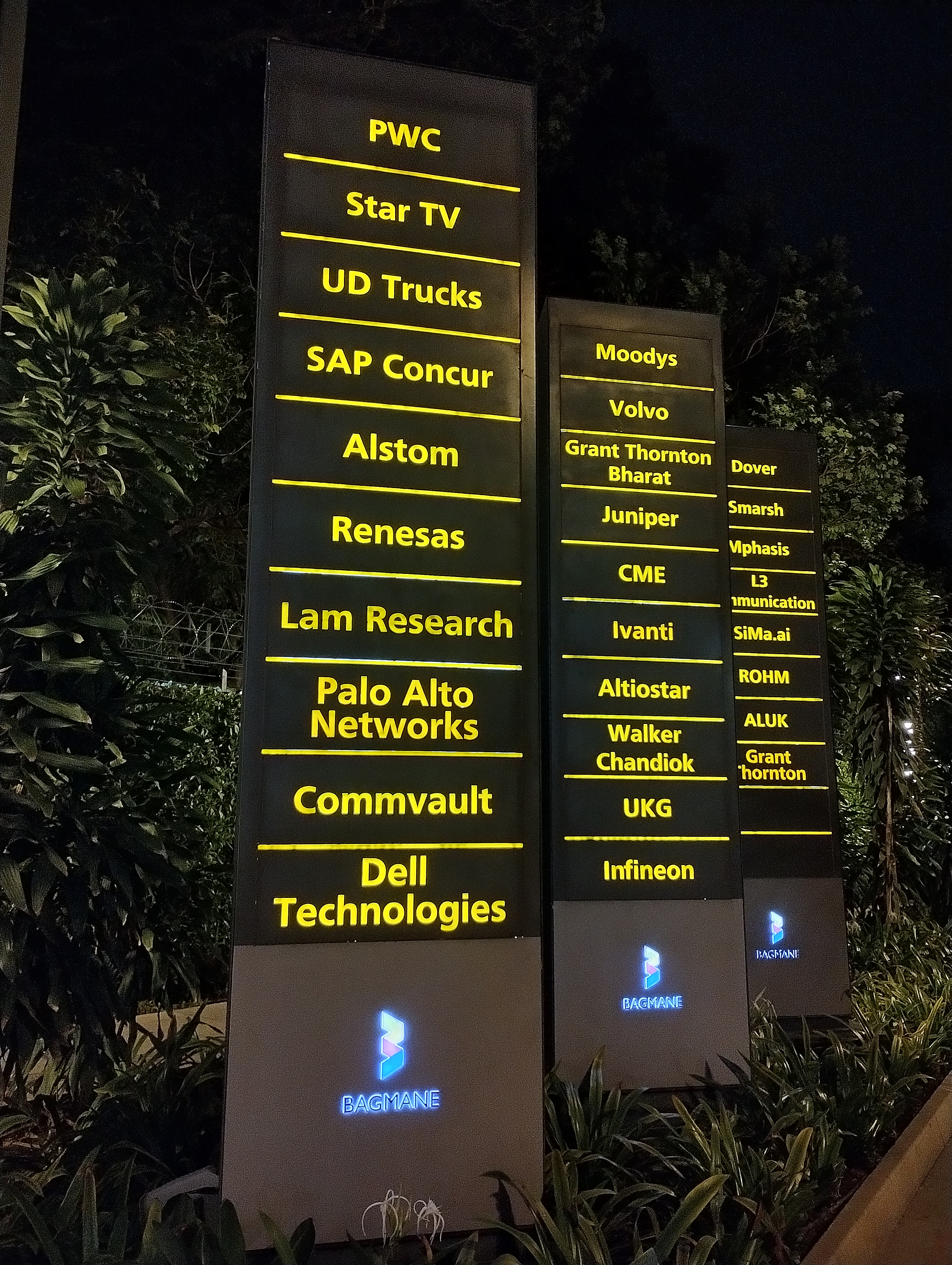
An entrance to Bagmane Tech Park, Bangalore, showing some of the major corporate offices hosted therein

India is a worldwide centre for information technology and business services, which add 7.5% to GDP and over 35% to services sold abroad. This sector is sustained by a large English-speaking skilled labour force, with revenues surpassing $300 billion in Fiscal Year 2026. Although the industry once relied on basic call centres and simple software fixes, it has shifted toward cloud computing, artificial intelligence, and international tech hubs. Bangalore has grown from a cheap offshore site into a top centre for corporate research, making it one of the largest technology hubs outside Silicon Valley.

India's automotive sector comprises 7.1% of its economy. It produces 28 million vehicles every year of which the vast majority are two-wheelers (77%) followed by passenger cars (18%). In 2022, 8 per cent of Indian households owned a car, 55 per cent owned a bicycle, and 54 per cent a motor cycle or scooter. In 2023, India became the third-largest automobile market in the world, with buyers, many of whom are in their 30s, increasingly preferring SUVs.

India's pharmaceutical sector relies on a vast network of production facilities focused on low-cost manufacturing. Thousands of individual factories and domestic firms comprise this sector and together make India the main worldwide source of generic medications and vaccines by volume. However, the sector faces supply line vulnerabilities, especially a reliance on China for over 70% of its raw active pharmaceutical ingredients (APIs). Although India faces international quality-control audits in its factories, adverse outcomes have dropped from 12 per cent in 2015 to 8 per cent in 2025, and 80% of those were in small firms not the top 20 companies.

India's total installed electricity capacity exceeds 532 GW, with non-fossil and renewable energy sources contributing more than 283.5 GW, or roughly 53%. The country's usage of coal is a major cause of India's greenhouse gas emissions, but its renewable energy capacity is growing. India emits about 7% of global greenhouse gas emissions. This equates to about 2.5 tonnes of carbon dioxide per person per year, which is half the world average. Increasing access to electricity and clean cooking with liquefied petroleum gas have been priorities for energy in India.

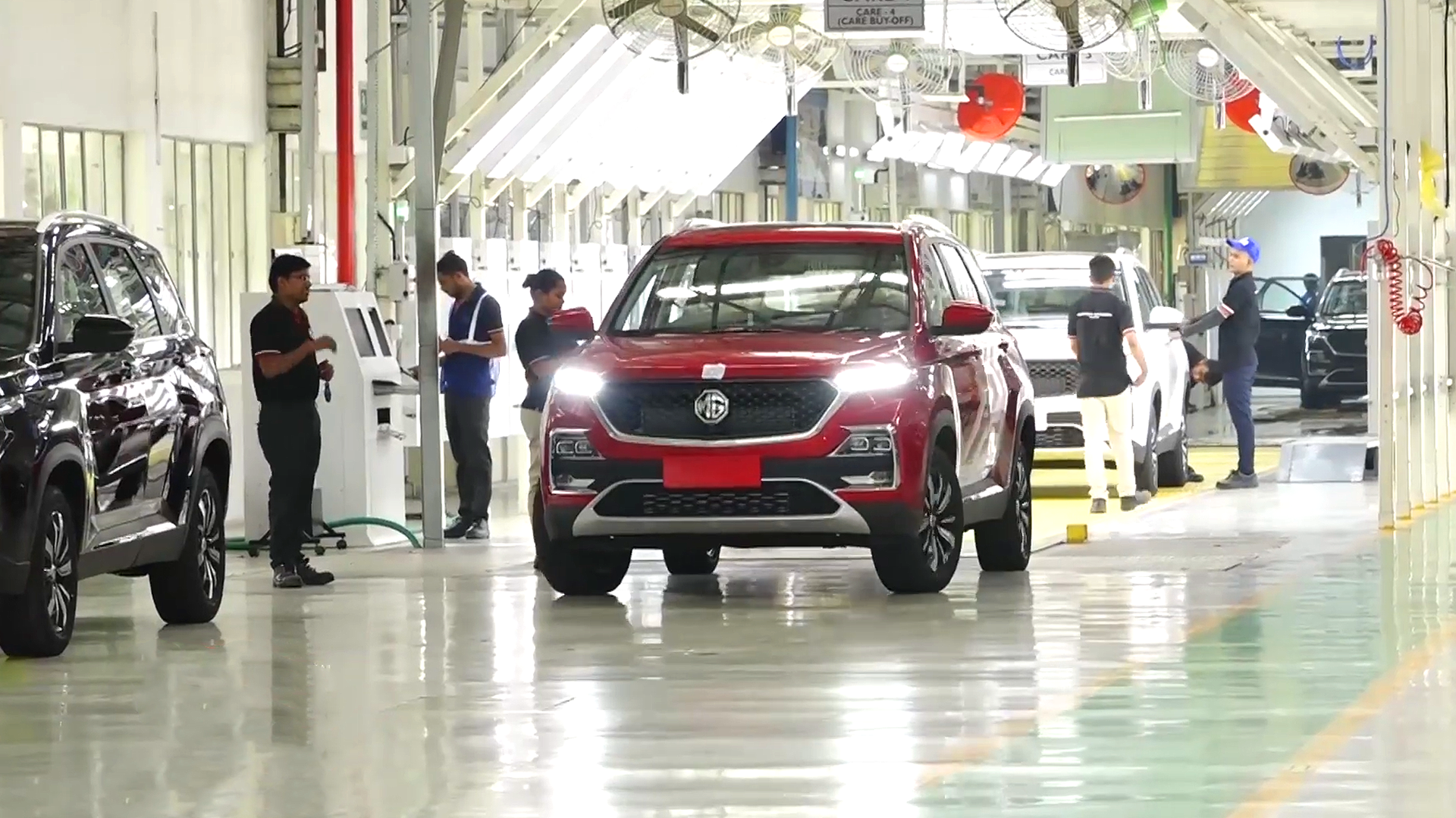
A vehicle on the assembly line at a MG Motors manufacturing plant in Halol, Gujarat. India is the world's third-largest automobile market by sales.

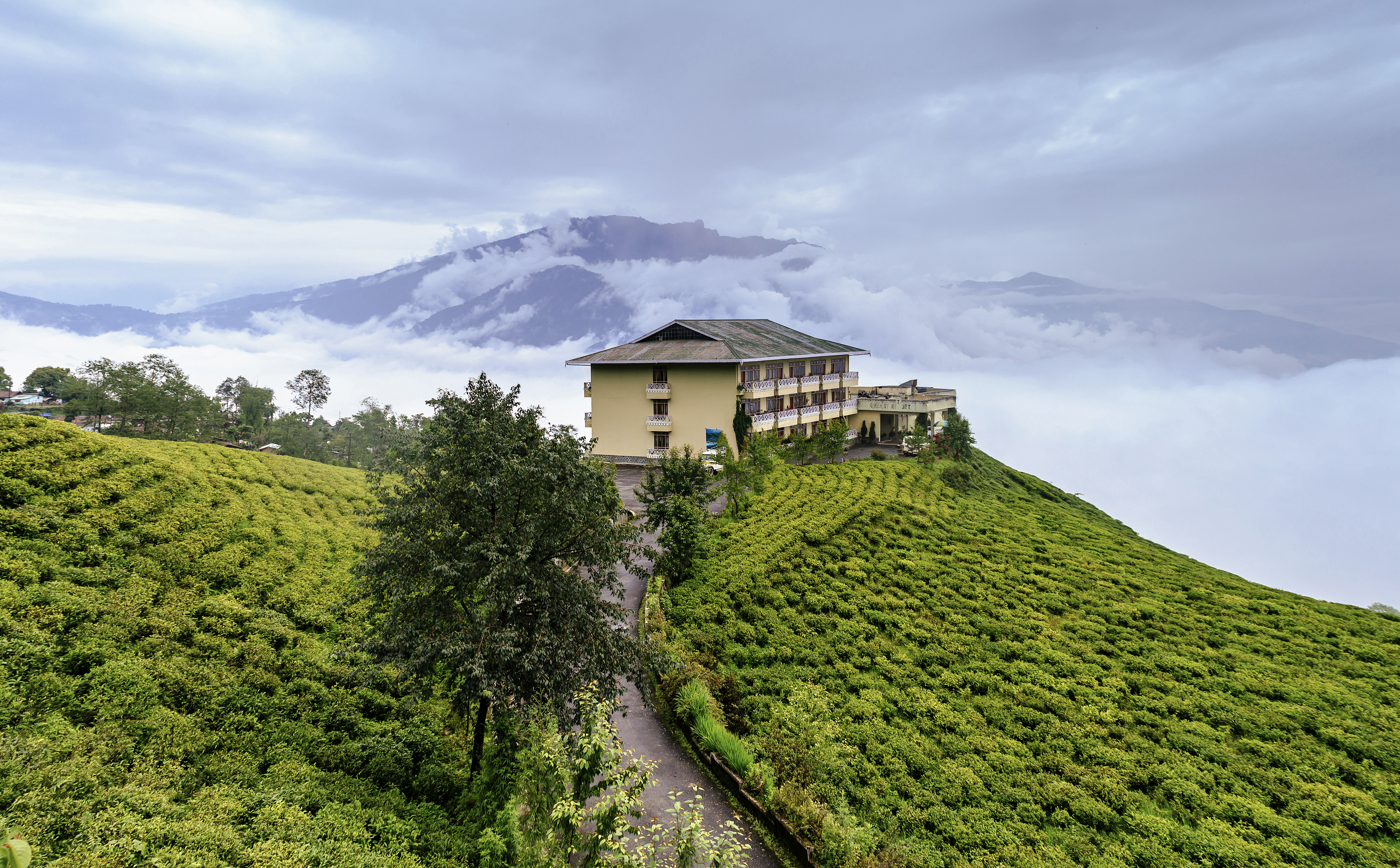
A tea garden in Sikkim. India, the world's second-largest tea producer, is a nation of one billion tea drinkers who consume 70% of India's tea output.

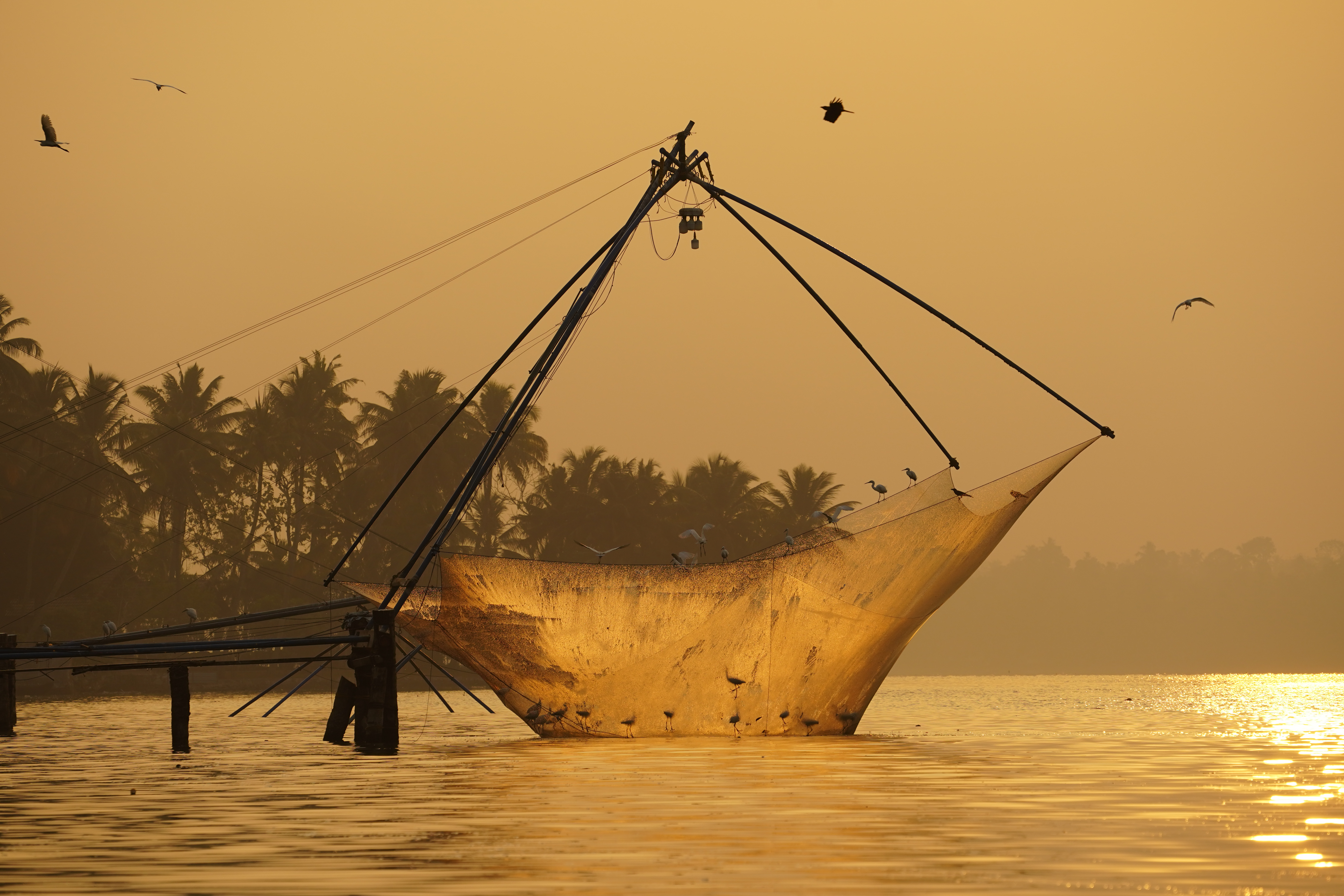
A Chinese fishing net being raised in Kollam. Fishing contributes 1.07% to India's total GDP, and supports over 28 million people, especially within vulnerable communities.

== Demographics ==
India's population was 361 million in 1951. It grew to approximately 1.464 billion in 2025, surpassing China's population in 2021. 1,210,193,422 residents were reported in the 2011 provisional census report. The median age was 28.7 in 2020. Medical advances made in the last 50 years as well as increased agricultural productivity brought about by the "Green Revolution" have caused India's population to grow rapidly, though India's decennial rates of growth are decreasing: its population grew by 17.64% from 2001 to 2011, compared to 21.54% growth in the previous decade (1991–2001). The first post-colonial census, conducted in 1951, counted 361 million people. The life expectancy at birth has increased from 49.7 years in 1970–1975 to 72.0 years in 2023. The under-five mortality rate for the country was 113 per 1,000 live births in 1994, and had declined to 41.1 per 1,000 live births by 2018.

The 2011 census reported a human sex ratio of 940 females per 1,000 males. Female infanticide in India, and lately female foeticide, have created lopsided gender ratios; the number of missing women in the country quadrupled from 15 million to 63 million during the period 1964–2014, faster than the population growth during the same period. According to an Indian government study, an additional 21 million girls are unwanted and do not receive adequate care. Despite a government ban on sex-selective foeticide, the practice persists.

Migration from rural to urban areas has been an important dynamic in India's recent history. The number of people living in urban areas grew by 31.2% between 1991 and 2001. In 2001, over 70% lived in rural areas. The level of urbanisation increased further from 27.81% in the 2001 census to 31.16% in the 2011 census. The overall population growth rate slowed because rural growth declined sharply after 1991. In the 2011 census, there were 53 million-plus urban agglomerations in India, among them Mumbai, Delhi, Kolkata, Chennai, Bangalore, Hyderabad and Ahmedabad, in decreasing order by population.

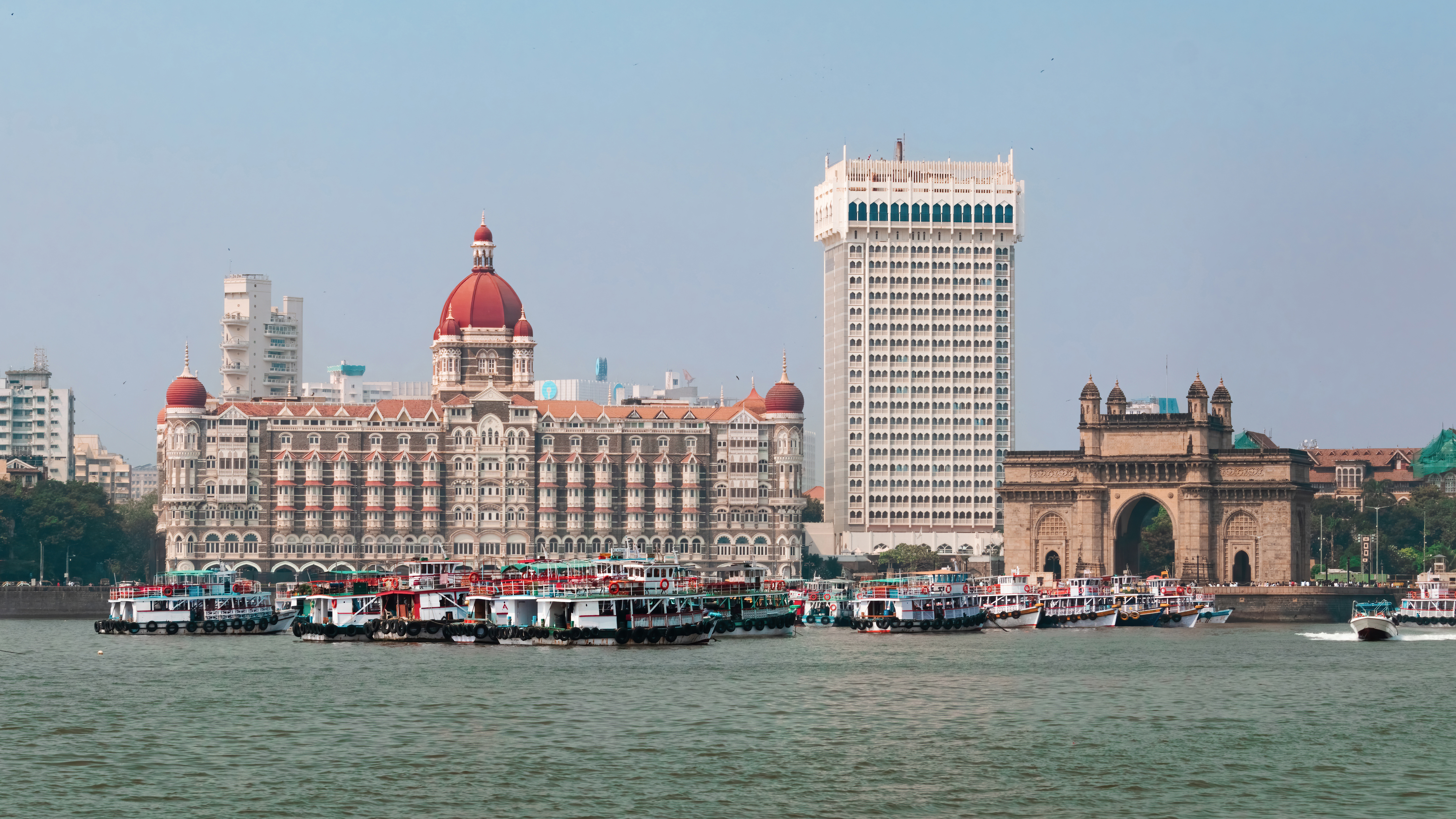
Mumbai is India's largest urban agglomeration. The image shows the Taj Mahal Palace Hotel on the left and the Gateway of India.

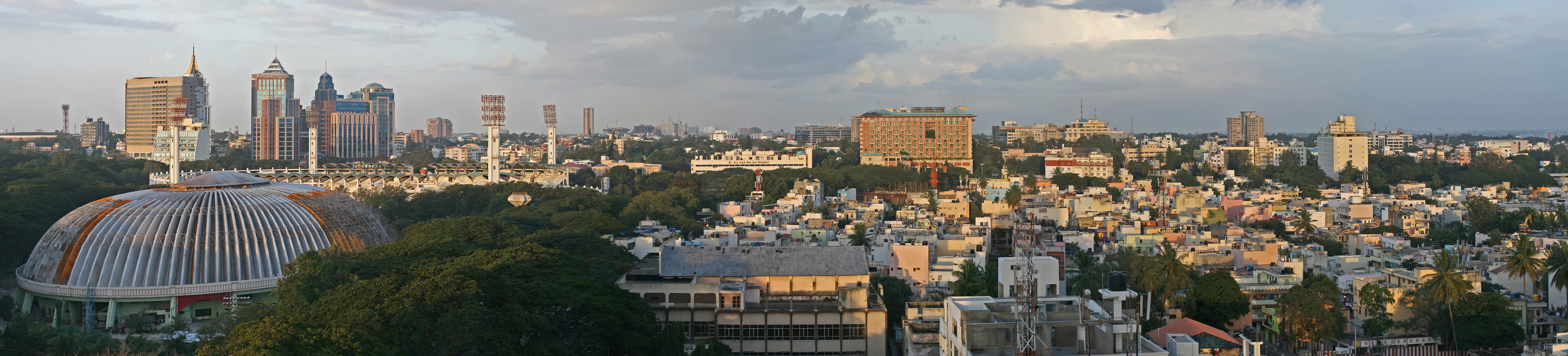
A panorama of Bangalore, the fifth-largest urban agglomeration. In the 1980s, when the first multinational corporations began to set up centres in India, they chose Bangalore because of the large pool of skilled graduates in the area, in turn due to the many science and engineering colleges in the surrounding region.

=== Languages ===
Languages of India belong to several language families. The 2011 Census of India, the last conducted by the Indian government, gives the following breakdown:

Language families and speakers in India
Rank	Language family	Sub-family	Number of languages	Number of speakers	Percentage of speakers
1	Indo-European	Indo-Aryan	21	945,052,555	78.05%
1	Indo-European	Iranian	1	21,677	0% (Note: The 0% results from rounding to two decimal places.)
1	Indo-European	Germanic	1	259,678	0.02%
2	Dravidian		17	237,840,116	19.64%
3	Austro-Asiatic		14	13,493,080	1.11%
4	Tibeto-Burman		66	12,257,382	1.01%
5	Semito-Hamitic		1	54,947	0%

There are also small numbers of speakers of Tai–Kadai, Andamanese, and minor language families and isolates.

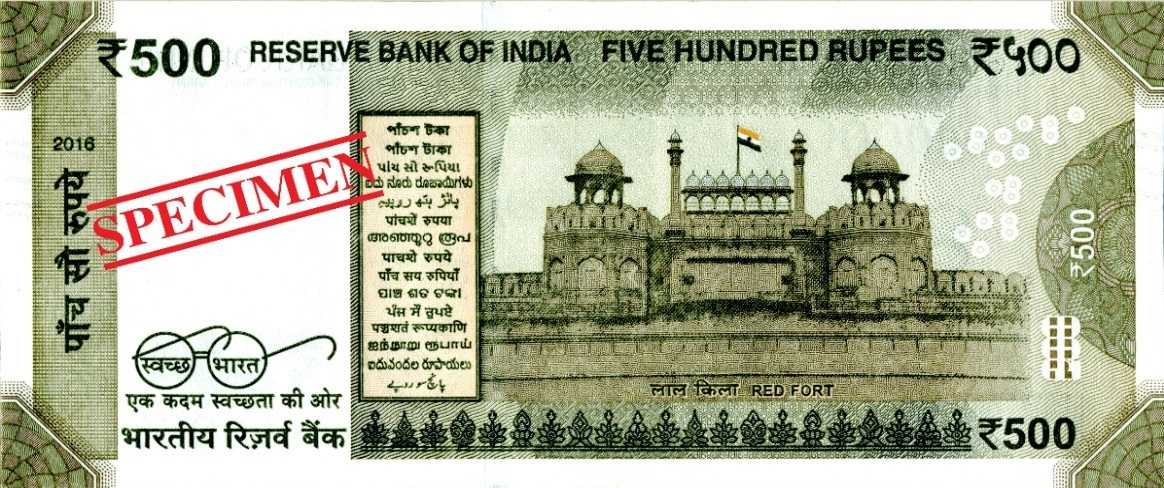
On the reverse of each of India's paper money notes, the denomination is listed in a panel on the left in 15 languages, in addition to Hindi and English, which appear more prominently elsewhere. These are from top to bottom: 1. Assamese, 2. Bengali, 3. Gujarati, 4. Kannada, 5. Kashmiri, 6. Konkani, 7. Malayalam, 8. Marathi, 9. Nepali, 10. Oriya, 11. Punjabi, 12. Sanskrit, 13. Tamil, 14. Telugu, 15. Urdu.

The Constituent Assembly of India chose the official language of India's federal government in September 1949 after three years of debate between two opposing camps. Hindi language protagonists wanted Hindi in the Devanagari script to be the sole "national language" of India whereas delegates from South India preferred English to have a place in the Constitution. The compromise reached declared (i) Hindi to be the "official language" of India's federal government; (ii) English to be an associate official language for 15 years during which Hindi's formal lexicon would be developed; and (iii) the international form of Hindu–Arabic numerals to be the official numerals. The compromise resolution became articles 343–351 of India's constitution, which came into effect on 26 January 1950. In 1965, after bitter opposition from South India to Hindi becoming the sole official language, a compromise was reached whereby English would continue to be an "associate official language" indefinitely.

The Eighth Schedule of India's Constitution also recognises 22 languages, including Hindi but not English, which the government must develop. These are sometimes called "scheduled languages". This list includes major regional languages, but also others—such as Sanskrit, which no longer has first language speakers in India, and Urdu, which is not region-specific—because of their value to India's cultural heritage. In 1950, there were 14 scheduled languages: Assamese, Bengali, Gujarati, Hindi, Kannada, Kashmiri, Malayalam, Marathi, Oriya, Punjabi, Sanskrit, Tamil, Telugu and Urdu. In the following decades constitutional amendments added others: Sindhi (1967), Nepali, Manipuri, and Konkani (1992), Maithili, Dogri, Santali and Bodo (2004).

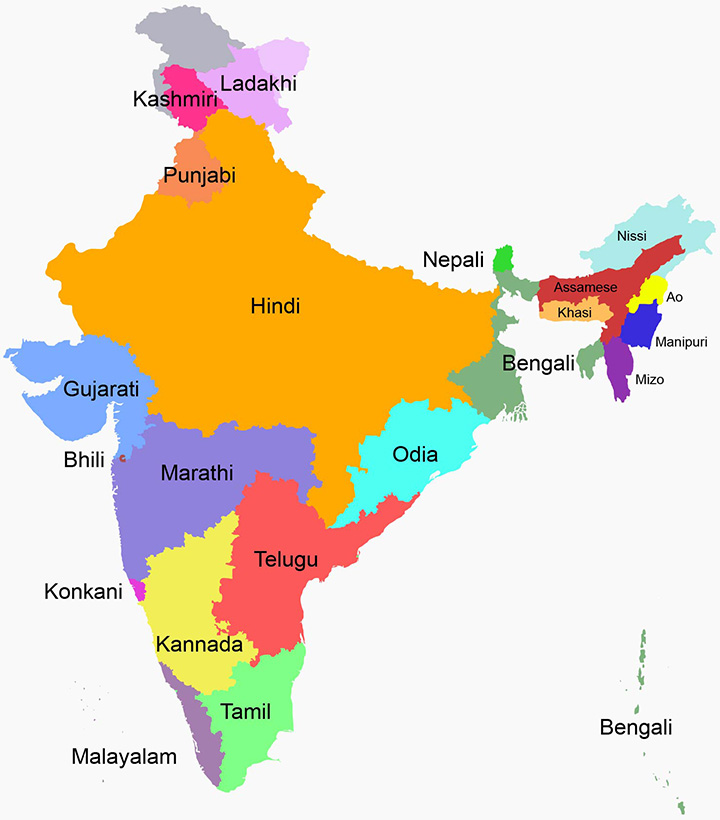
Map of India by dominant spoken native language

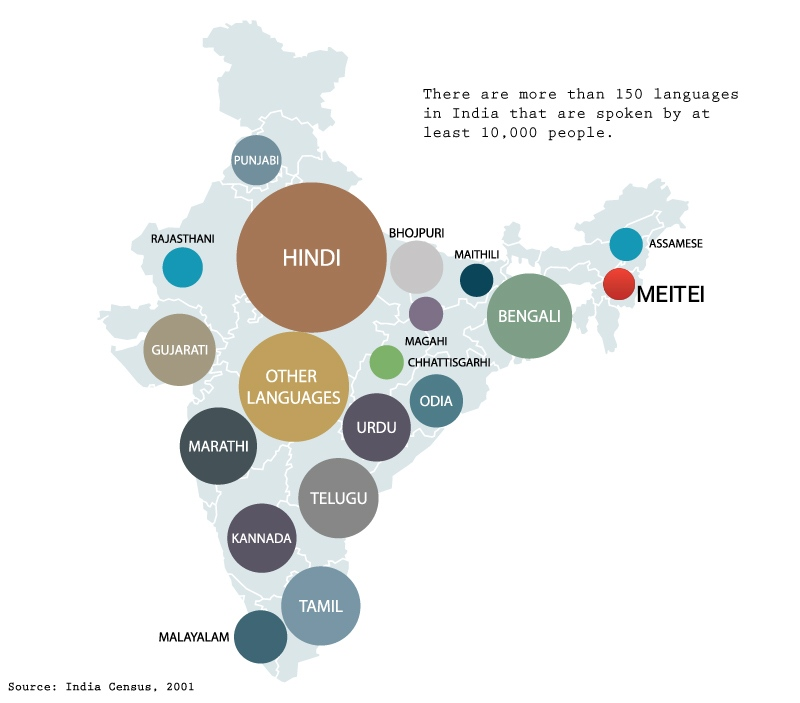
The main languages of India by relative numbers of speakers

=== Religion ===
Hinduism is the majority faith followed by nearly 80% of the population; Islam is the largest minority at over 14%. India also has populations of Christians and Sikhs in the tens of millions, Buddhists and Jains fewer than 10 million, and historical populations of Zoroastrians in the tens of thousands and Jews less than ten thousand.

As of the 2011 census, India's last census, Hindus comprised a majority in 28 of India's 35 states and union territories; this included the four most populous states: Uttar Pradesh (total population: 200 million; Hindu population: 80% of the state's total), Maharashtra (112 million, 80%), Bihar (104 million, 83%) and West Bengal (91 million, 71%). Muslims are in the majority in Lakshadweep Islands (60,000, 97%) and Jammu and Kashmir (8.6 million, 68%). Indian Christians make up about 2.3% of India's population. Saint Thomas Christians number around 8.7 million, whereas Indian Catholics number 11.8 million. Nearly 33% of Adivasi (or Scheduled Tribes of India's Constitution) are Christian. They are concentrated in three hill states of the northeast, Mizoram, Meghalaya, and Nagaland, where they constitute between 70% and 90% of the population. As per the 2011 census, Sikhs comprised less than 2% of India's population, though they were a majority in Punjab state, where more than 87% of Sikhs were farmers. Indian Buddhists number 8.45 million, with 77%, or 6.5 million, living in the state of Maharashtra. Indian Jains number 4.45 million, and Zoroastrians (Parsis), 60,000. As of 2019, there were 3,000 Jews in India, down from 28,000 in 1950. Other religions in India (and population in the 2011 census) are Sarnaism (4.96 million) and Gondi-Koyapunem (1.03 million) and Sari dharma (510,000).

In 1951—India's first postcolonial census—the percentage breakdown of India's religions was: Hindu (84.1%), Muslims (9.8%), Christians (2.3%), Sikhs (1.9%), Buddhists (0.7%) and Jains (0.5%); sixty years later, in India's last census (2011), the percentages were: Hindus (79.8%), Muslims (14.2%), Christians (2.3%), Sikhs (1.7%), Buddhists (0.7%) and Jains (0.4%) In absolute numbers, during the period 1951–2011, India's religious groups grew in the following manner: Hindus (304 million to 966 million), Muslims (35 million to 172 million), Christians (8.3 million to 28 million), Sikhs (6.82 million to 20.83 million), Buddhists (2.67 million to 8.44 million) and Jains (1.66 million to 4.45 million). In the decade 1951–1961, the population growth by religions was: Hindus (20.7%), Muslims (32.7%), Christians (29%), Sikhs (10.3%), Buddhists (5.9%), Jains (3.7%); in the decade 2001–2011, the growth was: Hindus (16.7%), Muslims (24.7%), Christians (15.7%), Sikhs (16.1%), Buddhists (4.8%), and Jains (2.2%). All religions have registered declining growth rates.

Birth rates, population growth, and access to education influence how communities mobilise politically to preserve their places of worship, to manage charitable trusts, and to protect their family laws. Differences in states' laws, especially those prohibiting religious conversion—usually from Hinduism to other faiths—colour the daily lives of minority communities. Providing constitutional protections for minorities in the face of majoritarian pressure remains a fraught challenge. India is a secular state and guarantees the fundamental right to freedom of religion ("Liberty of thought, expression, belief, faith, and worship").

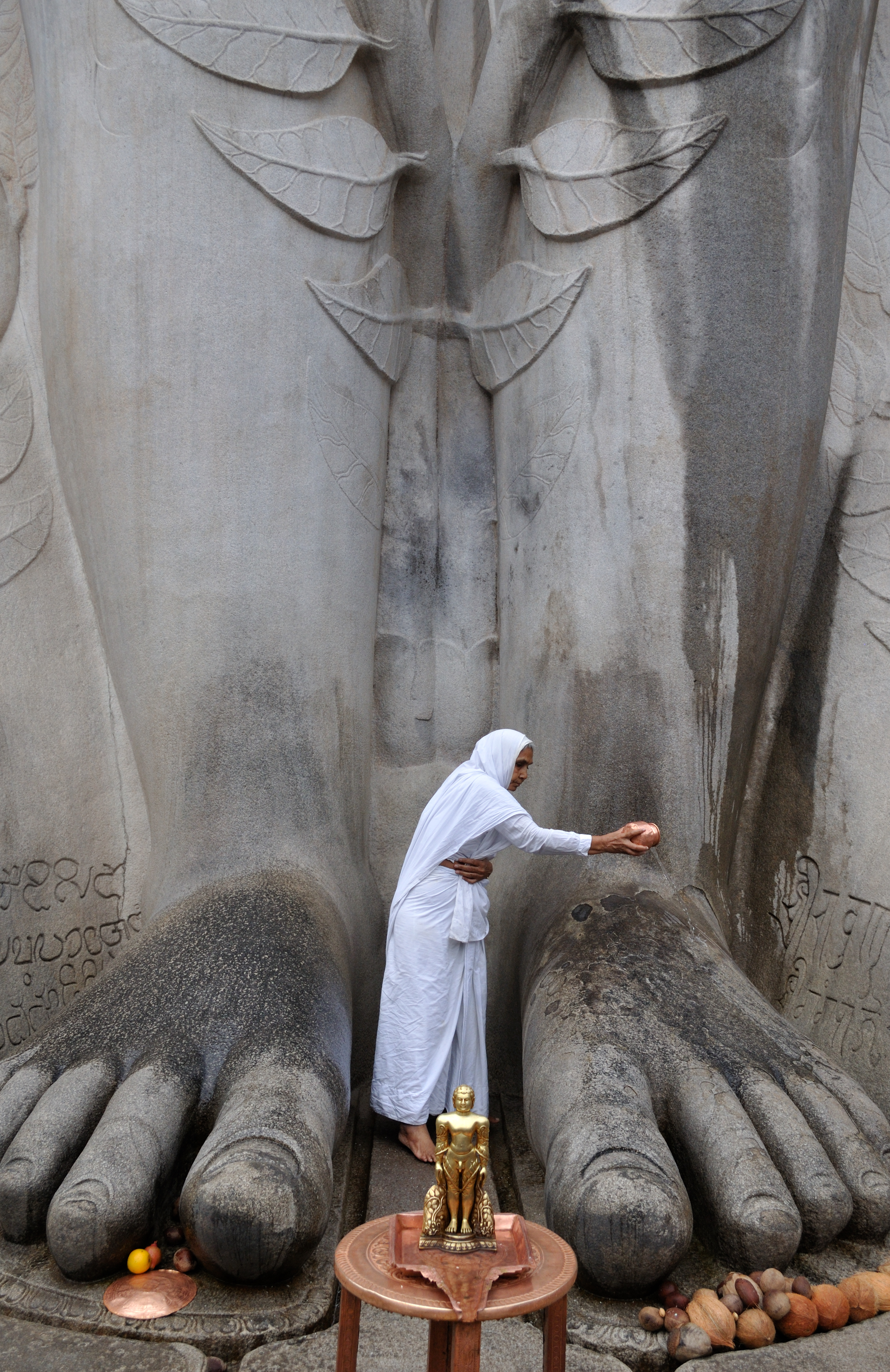
Jain pilgrim, Shravanabelagola

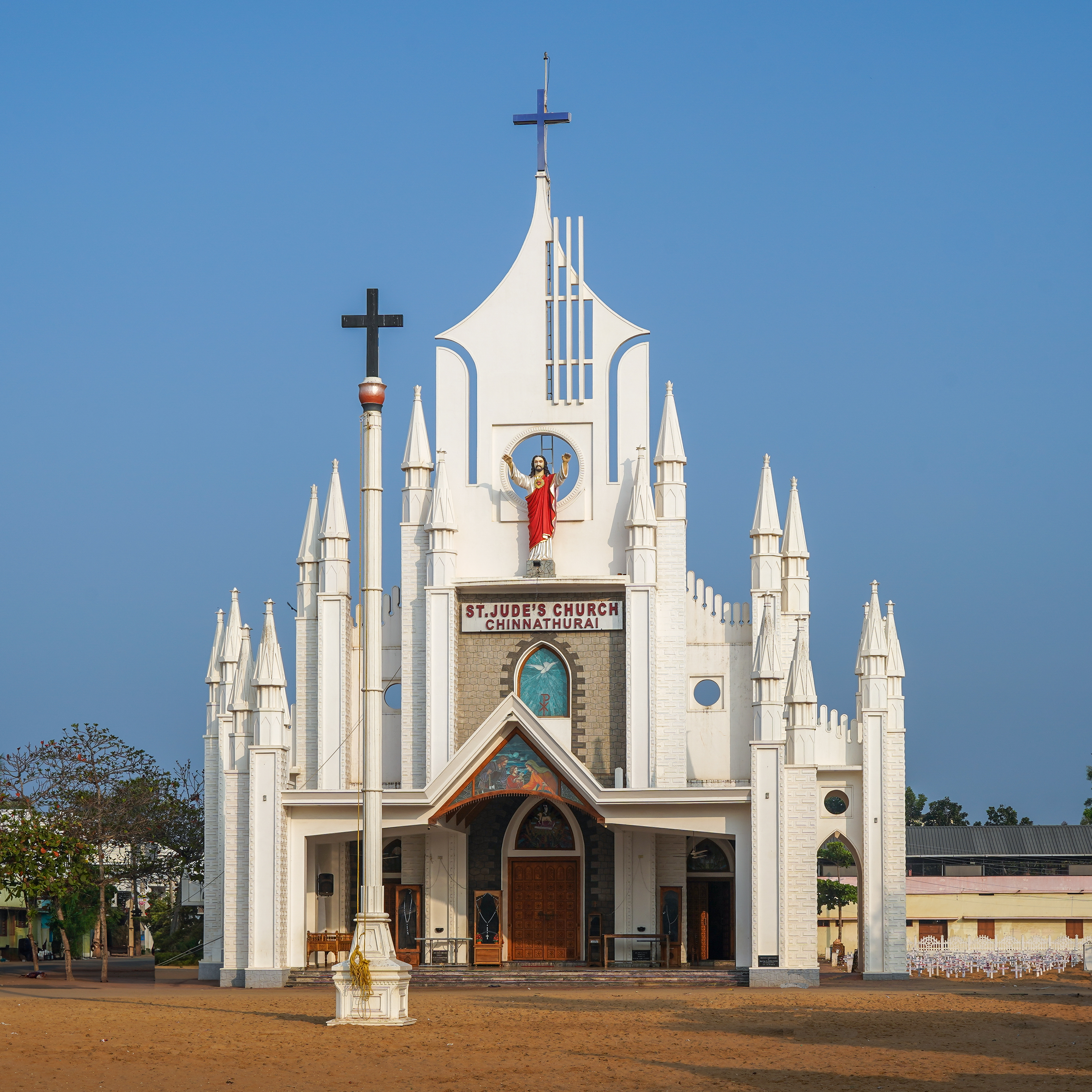
The exterior of St Judes Church, Chinnathurai

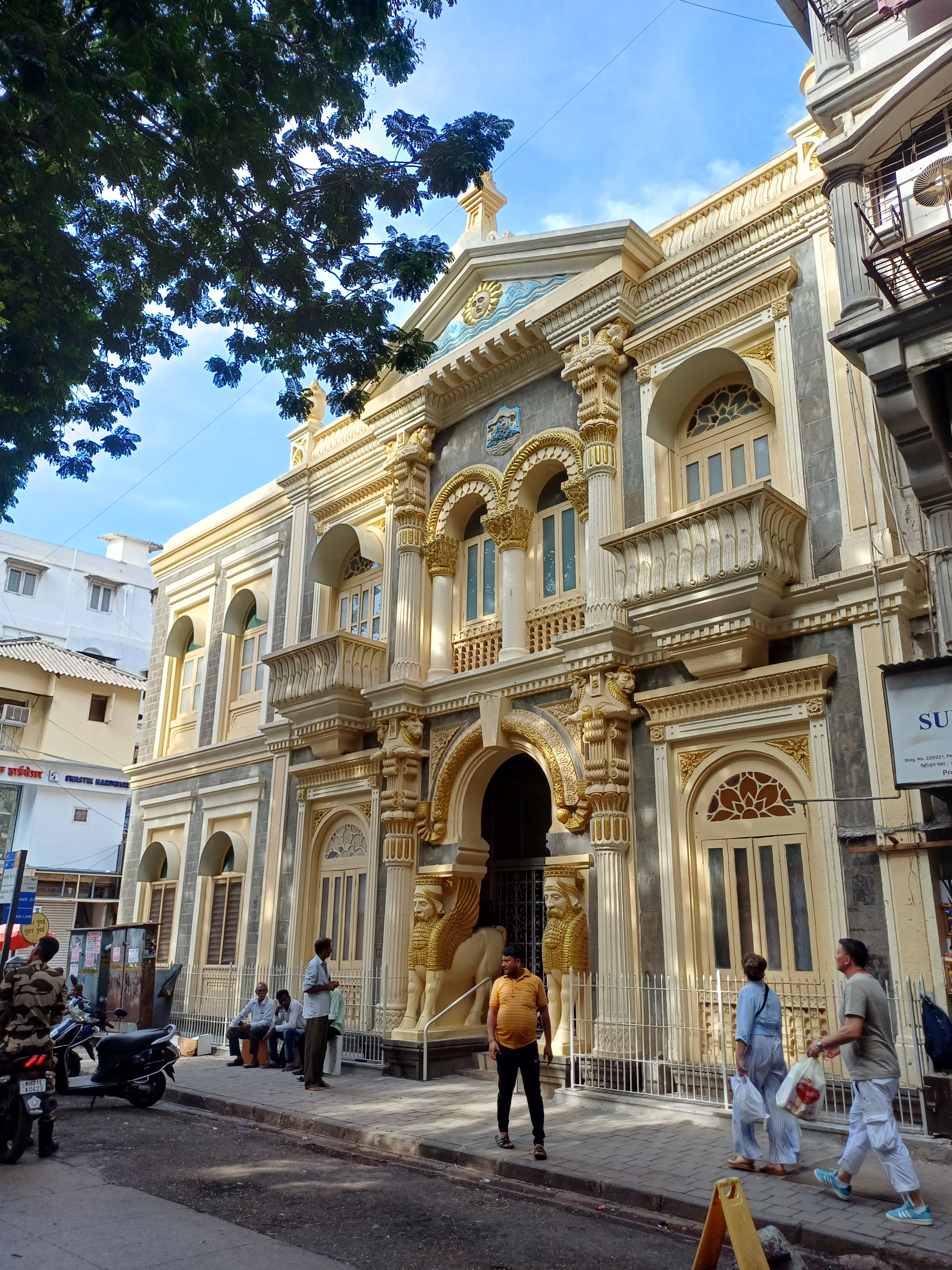
Zoroastrian agiary, Mumbai

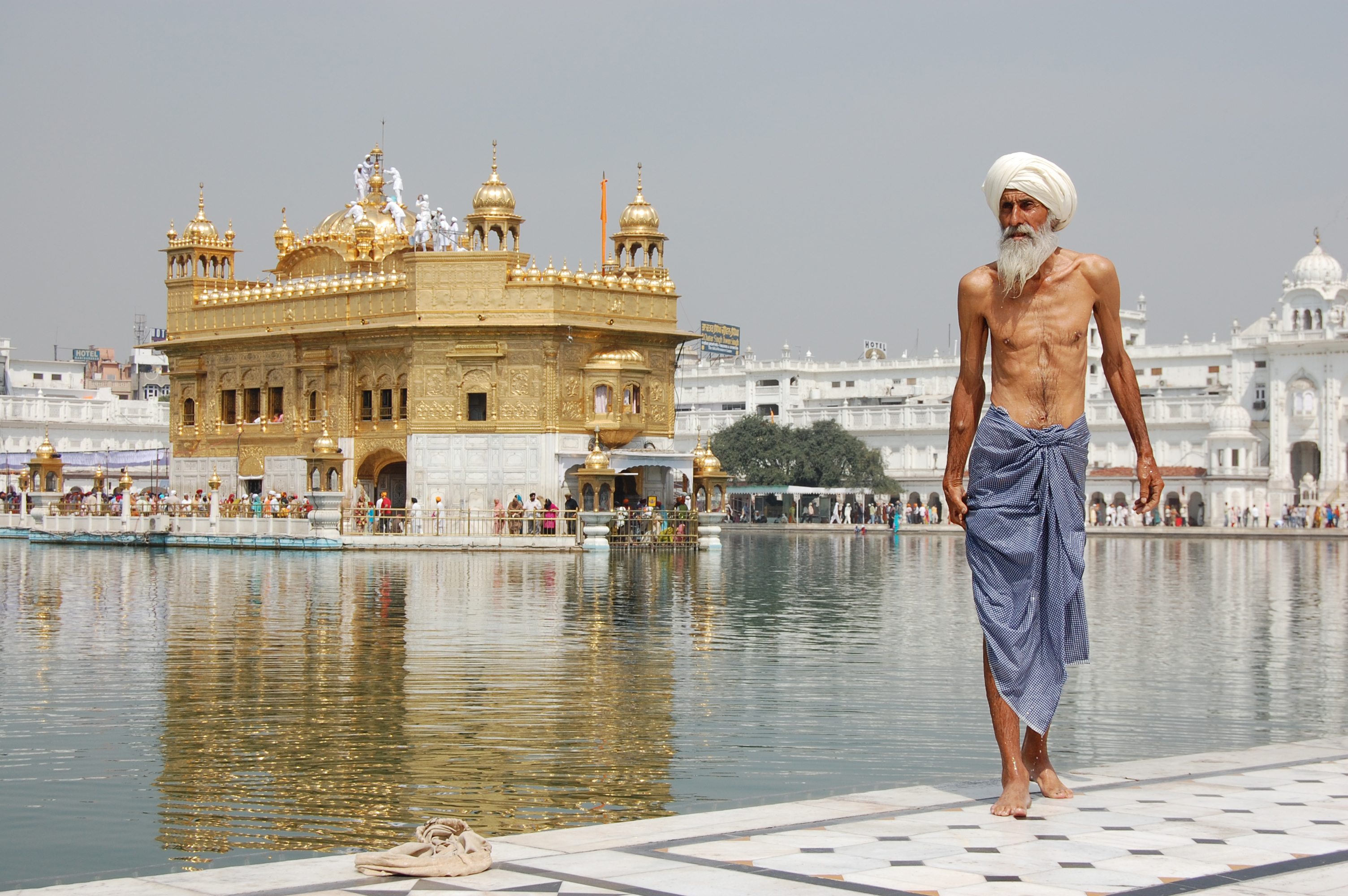
A Sikh pilgrim at the Golden Temple in Amritsar

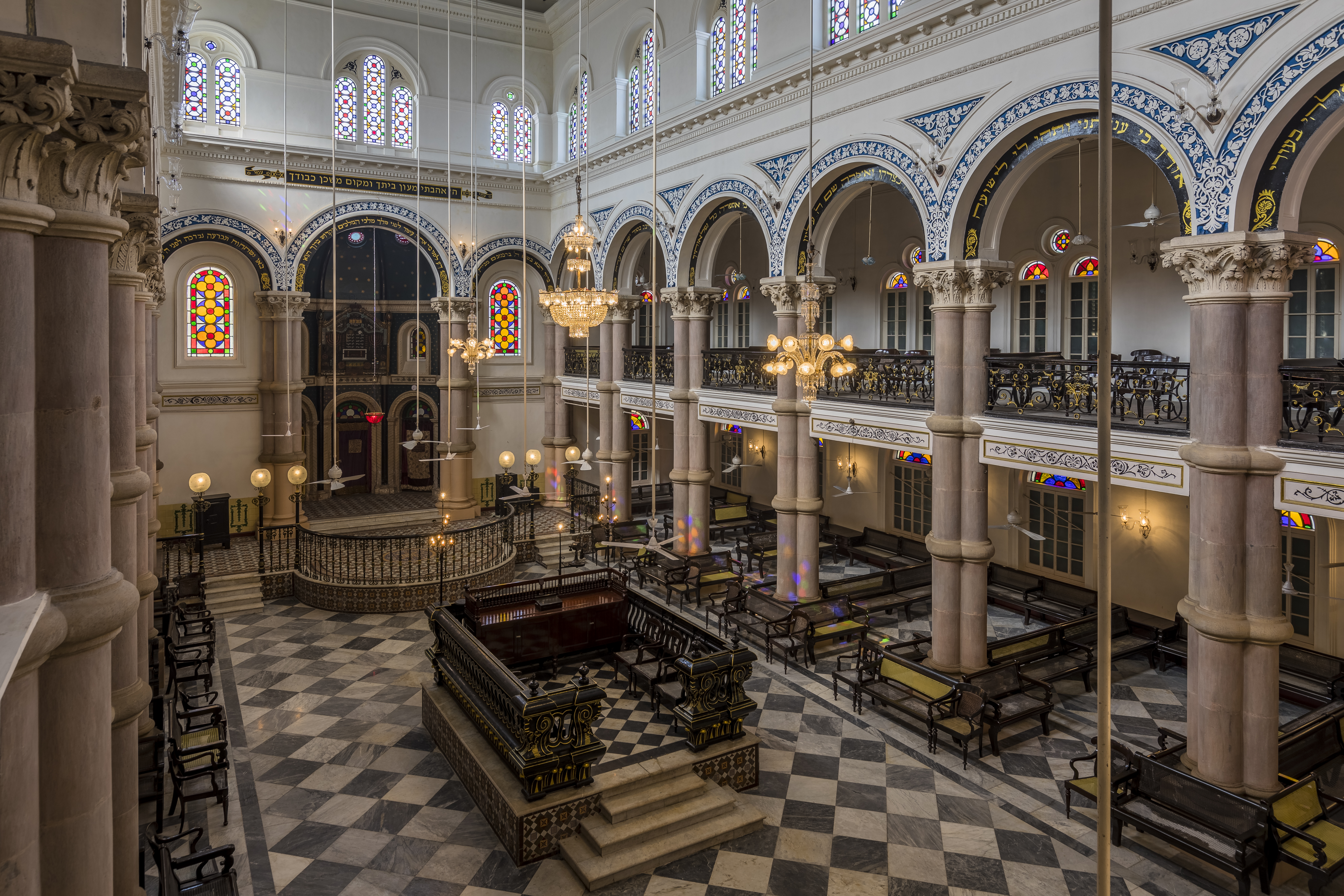
Interior of the Magen David Synagogue, Kolkata

=== Education ===
In 1911, there were three primary schools for every ten villages in British India. Early literacy was low: It was 5% in 1891 (9% for men and 1% for women) and 7% in 1921 (12% for men and 2% for women). Historically, local diversity limited literacy growth in India because caste and religious fragmentation reduced private spending. Literacy rates rose to 18% in 1951 (27% for men and 9% for women) and 41% in 1981 (53% for men and 29% for women). By 2011, literacy reached 74.04% (82.14% for men and 65.46% for women). They ranged from Kerala's 93.91% to Bihar's 63.82%. Meanwhile, rural gains reached twice the level of urban, narrowing the rural-urban gap from 21.2 percentage points in 2001 to 16.1 in 2011.

The central, state, and local governments manage education in India. Every child between the ages of 6 and 14 has a right to education, which is free and compulsory. Traditionally, children had spent eight years in primary school before moving on to high school. In 2020, the National Education Policy changed this division to one based on developmental stages: a foundational stage: five years of pre-school and standards 1–2, for ages 3–8; a preparatory stage: standards 3–5; a middle stage: standards 6–8; and a secondary stage: standards 9–12. Critics argue that the new plan, although progressive, suffers from public underfunding and inadequate school infrastructure.

The first universities in India were founded in Calcutta, Bombay, and Madras in 1857, the last year of East India Company rule. India now has one of the world's largest post-secondary education systems. Recent college reforms envisage offering more flexible degrees, creating online learning tools, and inviting foreign universities to set up campuses in India. However, large gaps remain between rural and urban areas. School quality, campus building conditions, and computer access vary substantially based on a student's gender and family's wealth. Poor job prospects for graduates and uneven rule enforcement across different states have faced criticism from researchers and the public alike.

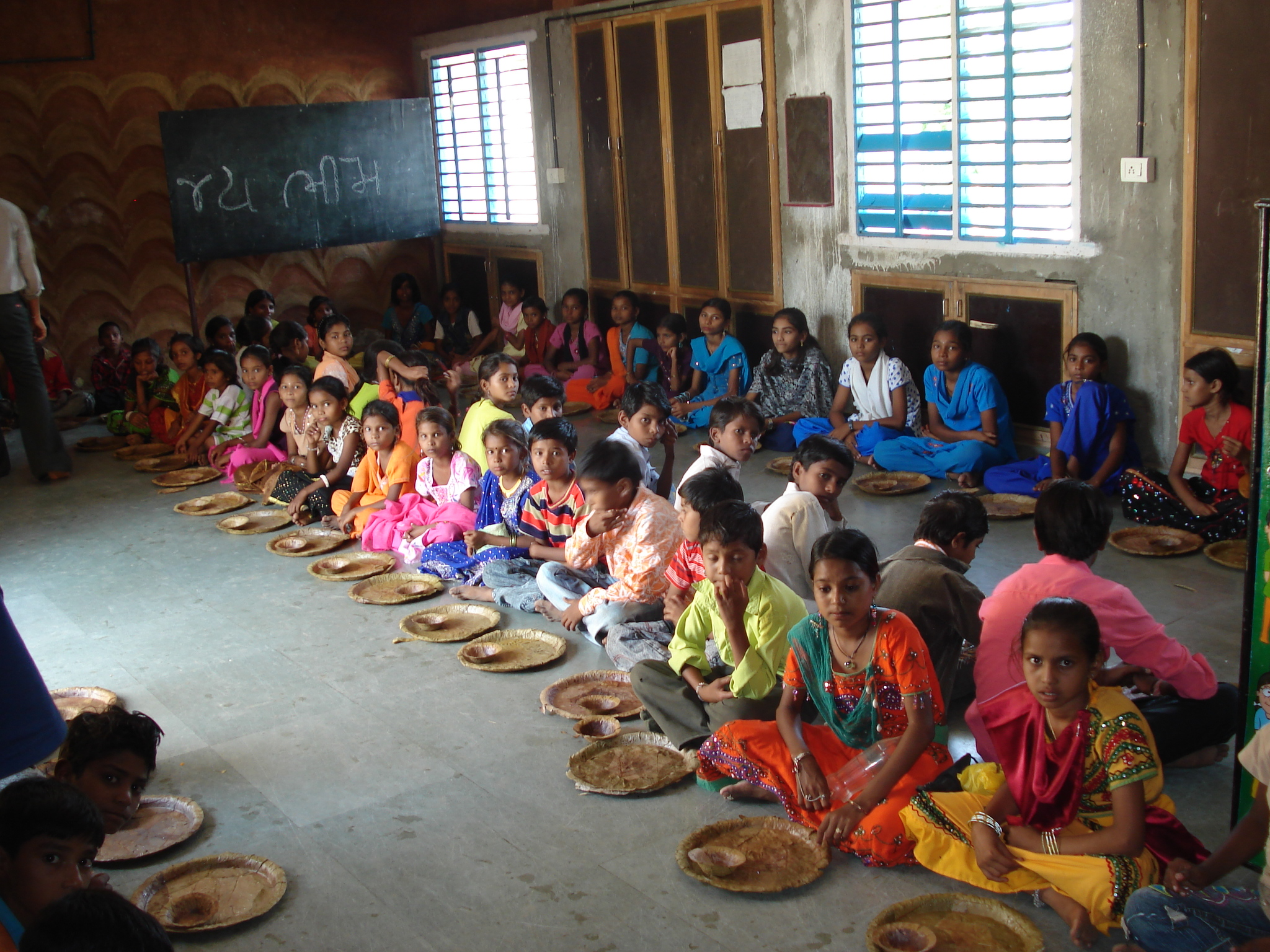
Children await school lunch in Rayka (also Raika), a village in Gujarat. The salutation Jai Bhim on the blackboard honours the jurist, social reformer, and Dalit leader B. R. Ambedkar.

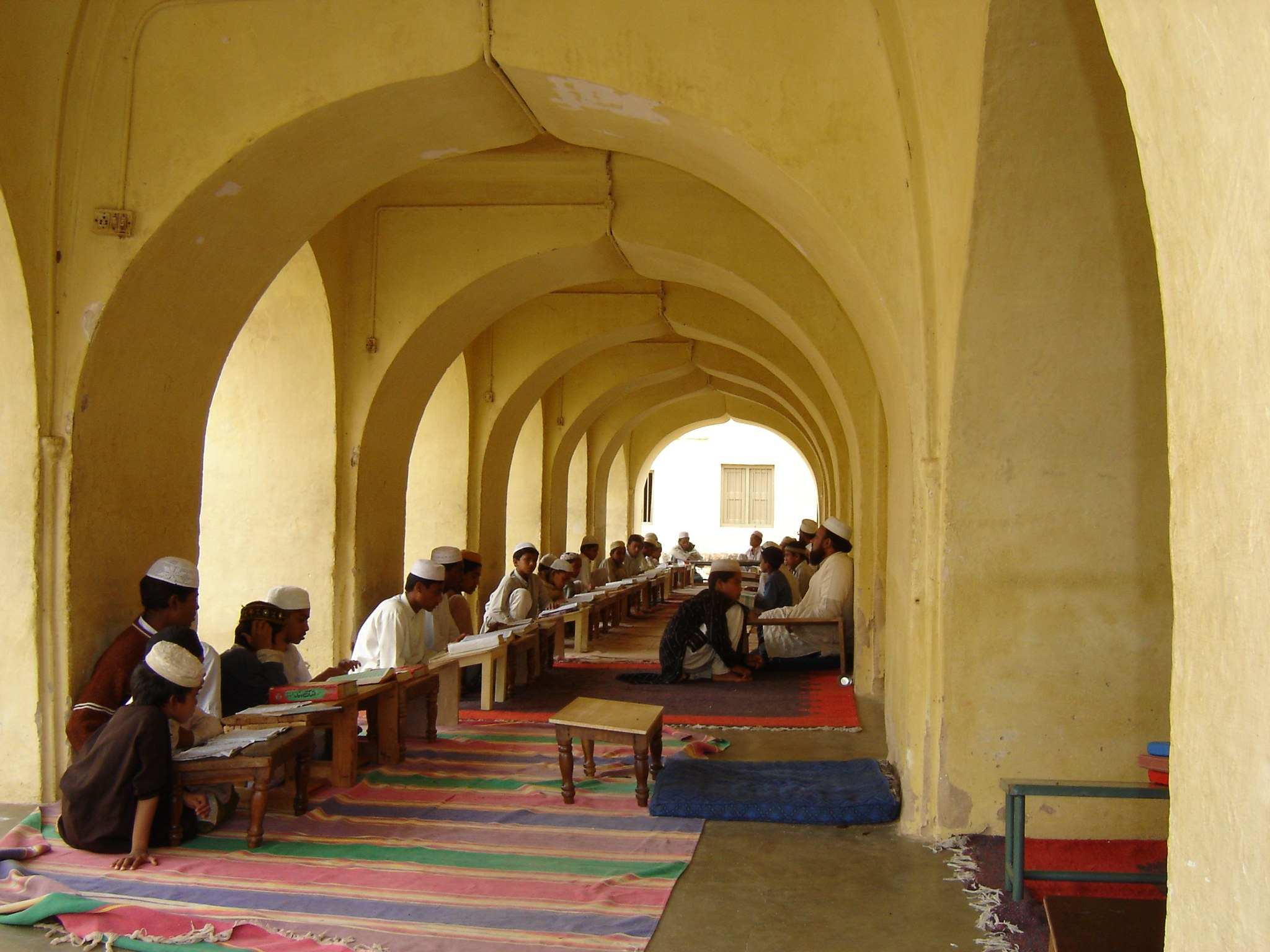
The Madrasah of the Masjid-i-Ala mosque in Srirangapatna, Karnataka, built in the period 1786–87, during the rule of Tipu Sultan

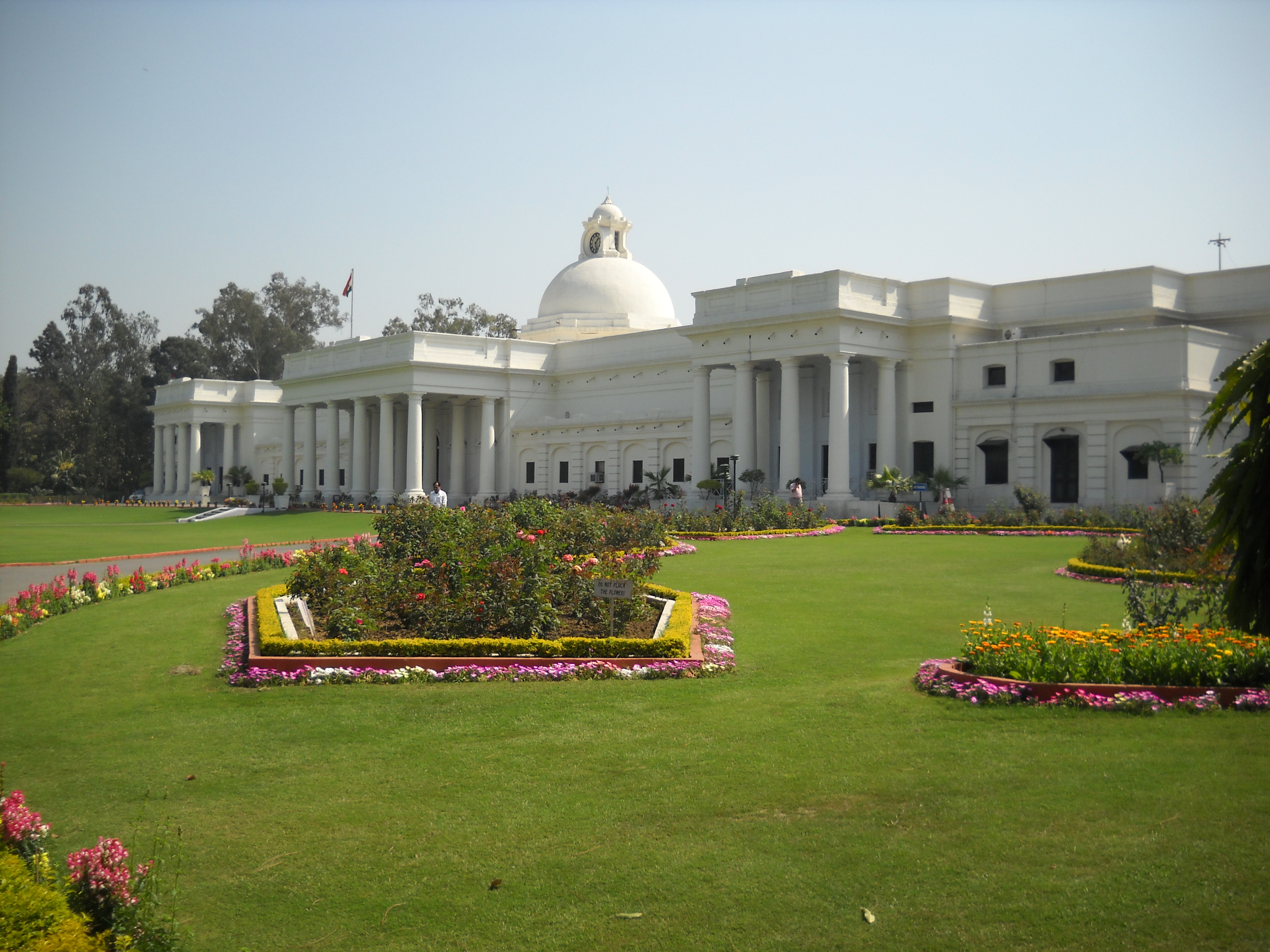
IIT Roorkee, formerly the Thomason College of Civil Engineering, is the oldest engineering college in India. It was founded in 1847 during East India Company rule to train men employed in the construction of the Ganges Canal.

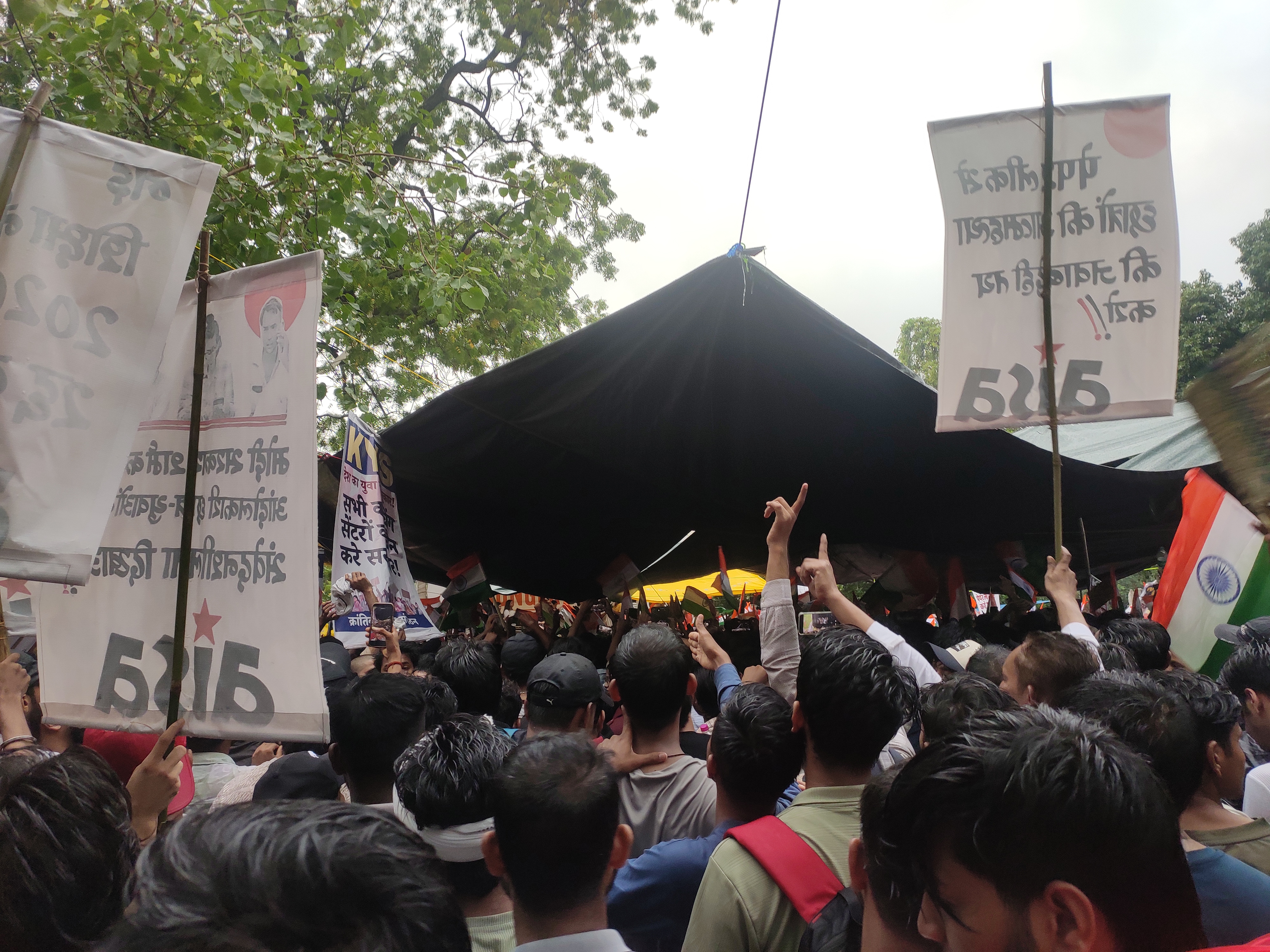
Students protesting Indian examination paper leaks—the illegal sharing or selling of official exam questions before the test begins—in Delhi, July 2026

=== Health ===
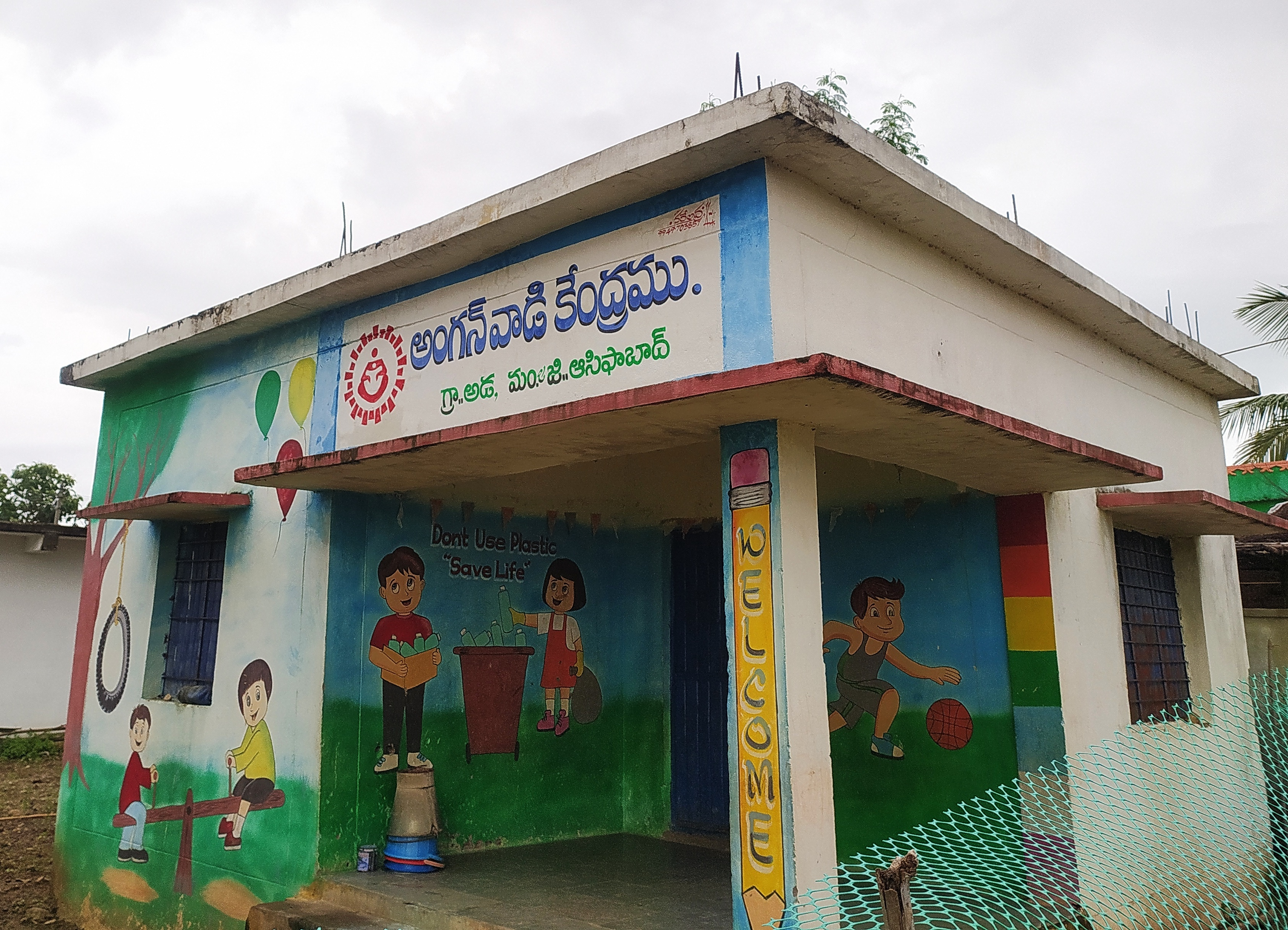
The Anganwadi centre in Ada village, Asifabad district, Telangana in July 2022. Child undernutrition and stunting rates have steadily declined in India, though the rate has slowed over the last decade. Anganwadi centres play a central role by providing localised supplementary nutrition and health counselling.

Since its 1947 independence, India has significantly reduced historically endemic diseases, though some remain intractable. The country was certified smallpox-free in April 1977 following two years of surveillance after its last Variola major case. It was officially certified polio-free by the World Health Organisation on 27 March 2014, after successfully completing three consecutive years without recorded cases of wild poliovirus. In contrast, cholera remains endemic to Ganges-Meghna Delta estuaries, resulting in seasonal outbreaks caused by monsoons and water supply network shortcomings. Tuberculosis is a major concern; India bears a quarter of the global tuberculosis disease burden. Historical malaria cases have dropped from millions to hundreds of thousands annually, but India experiences localised seasonal increases caused by drug-resistant variants of the Plasmodium falciparum and Plasmodium vivax vectors.

Patients in India often face a stark choice: use basic, free, publicly funded health care or pay high out-of-pocket fees for better-equipped care from private doctors and hospitals. This divide is particularly severe outside cities, as public clinics in rural areas rarely have enough doctors or nurses to meet local demands. When serious medical emergencies occur, poorer families are often forced to sell land or take out high-interest loans to pay for private care. This resulting medical debt pushes approximately 55 million people into poverty every year.

Long-term exposure to outdoor and indoor air pollution adds a major environmental risk to public health in India. Particulate matter emissions from vehicles and factories are linked to a rise in chronic respiratory diseases, strokes, and cardiovascular disease, together adding an estimated 1.7 million premature deaths annually. India's early COVID-19 lockdown bought time to rapidly increase local testing and protective gear production; however, later waves of the virus overwhelmed the healthcare system, leading to severe shortages of oxygen and intensive care beds. Post-pandemic epidemiological studies estimate that cumulative excess deaths in India reached between 3.2 and 4.7 million.

== Culture ==
=== Society ===
Although sometimes applied to other cultures and religions, caste is a fundamental social institution of India, most fully developed among Hindus. (Note: Caste is a form of social stratification characterised by endogamy, hereditary transmission of an occupation, ritual status in a hierarchy, and customary social interaction or exclusion defined by cultural notions of purity and pollution.) All Hindus fall broadly into four castes, or varnas: Brahmin, or priests, at the top; below them Kshatriya, or warriors; further below, Vaishya, or merchants and farmers; and at the bottom, Shudra, or the service class. Outside the caste system, and of traditional Hinduism, lie people formerly called "outcastes" or "untouchables," and now scheduled caste (a term used in India's constitution) or Dalit, a later self-description of pride, meaning "broken" or "downtrodden". Each caste is further divided into sub-castes, or jātis, many of which are tied to occupations. However, the custom of endogamy, or marrying within one's subcaste, makes caste a hereditary label rather than one of occupational choice and has entrenched the caste system. The Constituent Assembly of India abolished untouchability in 1947, the Republic of India did so more formally in 1950, and India has since enacted other anti-discrimination laws and social welfare initiatives related to caste. Still, caste-based inequality, discrimination, segregation, and violence persist.

Multi-generational patrilineal joint families have been the norm in India, though nuclear families are becoming common in urban areas. A very large majority of Indians have their marriages arranged by their parents or family elders. Marriage is thought to be for life, and the divorce rate is extremely low, less than one in a thousand. Many women marry before reaching 18, which is their legal marriageable age; child marriages are not uncommon, especially in rural areas. In large parts of Hindu northern India, moreover, a form of territorial exogamy is observed in which a bride marries out of her natal village, and her parents do not visit her in her married home; the annual rite raksha bandhan, during which married women return to their natal homes, has served both to affirm bonds with their natal families and offer a recourse in times of marital stress.

Modern Indian Muslim society is highly diverse, divided by local languages, distinct cultural backgrounds, and internal social classes. However, Indian Muslims have much lower college enrollment, less access to banking services, and far fewer formal jobs than average. Additionally, due to safety worries and unfair housing practices, many urban Muslims have been forced to move into separated neighbourhoods that often lack basic public services. Still, Muslim families regularly see higher rates of child survival compared to other religious and social groups. The Saint Thomas Christians, also known as Syrian Christians, trace their history to the arrival ashore in South India of St Thomas the Apostle in the 1st century CE, though inscriptions place their origins to the mid-first-millennium CE; they spread along the Malabar Coast of the state of Kerala, and have their distinctive liturgical traditions. Indian Catholics date their presence to 1500 soon after the arrival of Vasco da Gama in Calicut. Sikhism is a monotheistic tradition founded by Guru Nanak in the late 15th-century Punjab; it grew into a tight-knit fellowship under later gurus, the last guru ceding authority to the holy book Guru Granth Sahib.

Buddhism, founded by the Buddha in the mid-5th century BCE in the middle Ganges plain, eventually spread beyond India to Southeast Asia and East Asia, even as it waned in its homeland; nevertheless, its statues and stupas—stone realisations of the Buddha—remain prominent across the subcontinent, drawing pilgrims from around the world. Jainism, anciently contemporaneous with Buddhism, has two main sects, Śvetāmbara, whose monks and nuns wear robes and use bowls to receive alms, and Digambara, whose monks go naked and cup their hands for alms. Jains today, regardless of sect, have aligned themselves with environmentalism. The Parsis follow Zoroastrianism; they arrived on India's western coast from Iran late in the first millennium CE and rose in trade and industry, becoming early leaders of Indian nationalism. The Qissa-i Sanjan records their legendary arrival and welcome in India. Judaism, which had become established in India by the 8th-century CE, was never subject to antisemitism from Hindus, Christians, or Parsis, nor to ethnic tensions from Indian Muslims; it has preserved distinctive Indo-Judaic customs. (Note: The vast majority of India's 1.4 billion population are Hindus; 13.4 per cent are Muslims, 80 per cent of whom are Sunni Muslims; 2.5 per cent are Christian; and less than 0.0004 per cent are Jews. The majority of the 3,000 Jews remaining in India today live in Maharashtra, namely in Mumbai, the Konkan villages and Pune. There are small remnants of Jewish communities in Ahmedabad, New Delhi and Calcutta; only five Jews remain in 'Jew Town' in Mattancherry, Cochin, and a dozen or so more are scattered around Kerala. Even in their heyday before 1950, the Indian Jews from all three Jewish groups – Cochin Jews, Bene Israel and Baghdadis – only numbered 28,000 souls. They neither suffered from anti-Semitism at the hand of their fellow countrymen – Hindu, Christian, Parsee or other – nor experienced ethnic tensions with Indian Moslems. Somehow, they created and maintained unique Indo-Judaic customs, which they enacted in the multi-religious and complex society of India. The Baghdadi Jews never numbered more than 8,000 souls; today, just 70 remain in all of India.")

India has had a long history of religious pluralism that shapes its modern society. (Note: Gavin Flood has defined Hinduism to be "a range and history of practice" which references the texts and sacrifices in the Vedas; whose adherents belong to endogamous social units (jāti/varna); participate in rituals in which offerings are made to a deity and blessings received in return (puja); and profess an outwardly polytheism, but sometimes also an inwardly monotheism in which many gods are considered manifestations of one supreme being. Axel Michaels has echoed the assessment, "I propose that Hindu India is special in that rituals surpass belief ...." Islamic religious life in India, according to Barbara D. Metcalf, has a central Sufi tradition of inner spirituality, "cultivation of ethical norms," and a reverence for holy guides. There is also text-based scholarship, especially the study of prophetic traditions in the hadith.) A large majority of Indian Muslims, Christians, and Sikhs participate in customs, or adhere to beliefs, that were once unique to Hinduism (e.g. karma). Muslims, India's largest religious minority, have contributed significantly to a synthetic Indo-Islamic religious culture. Sufism, the heterodox mystical movement in Islam found receptiveness among adherents of the medieval regional Shaivite and Vaishnavite traditions of Bhakti. (Note: The tenets of Hindu and Muslim mystics were near enough that some Hindus were receptive to the sermons of Sufi masters (pirs), and syncretic movements arose.) Sikh gurdwaras and Sufi dargahs often attract both visitors and worshippers from other religions. India has monastic traditions such as that of Jain ascetics some of whom practice an extreme form of nonviolence (ahimsa) and Buddhist communities that have preserved ancient styles of meditations. This religious diversity coexists with religious endogamy—people rarely marry outside their faith. There is also religious segregation in housing—religious groups cluster by choice or necessity. Thus, India's religious picture has both rich intermixing and clear divisions.

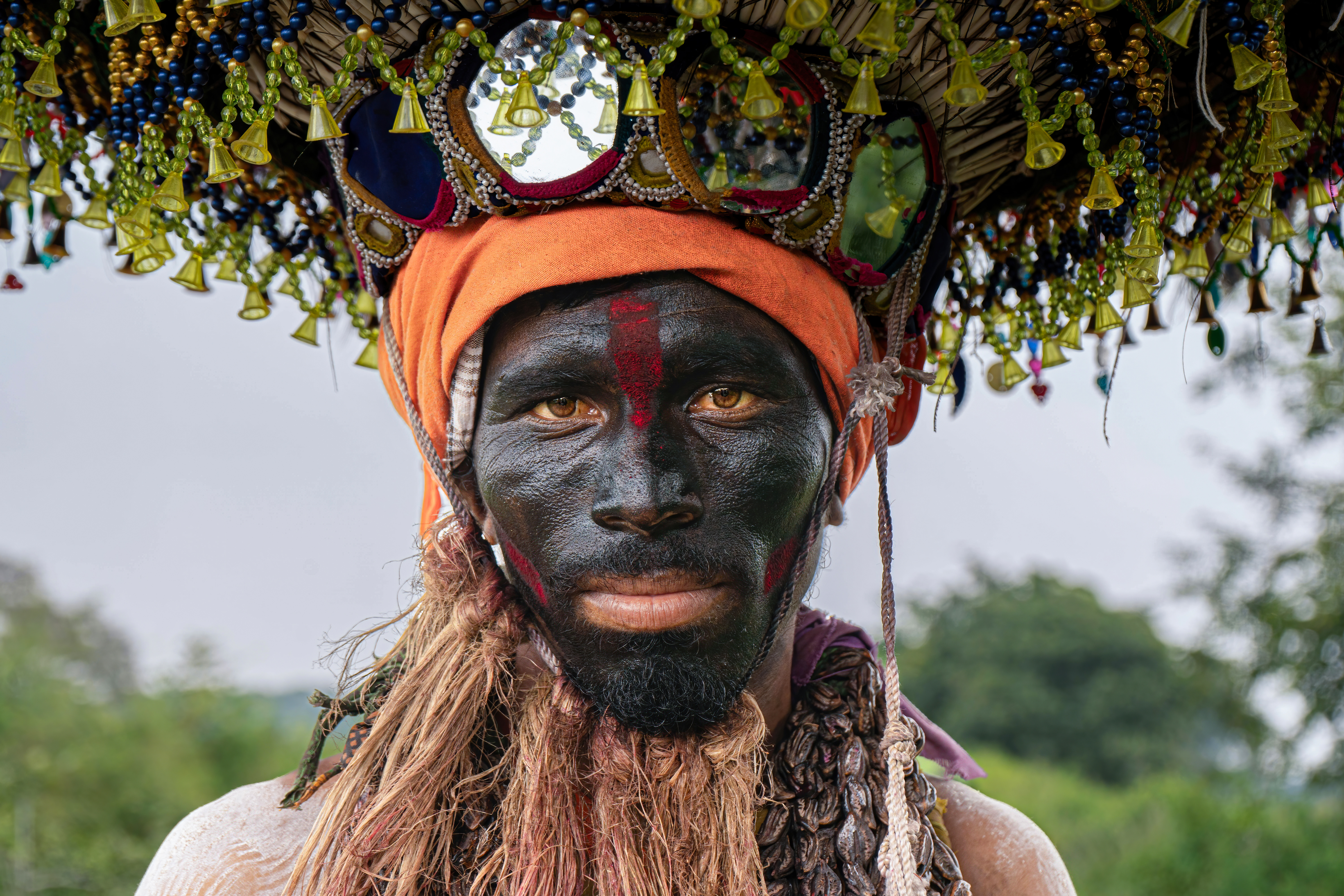
A Gond tribe member during the Dandari festival in Jainoor, Telangana. Gonds account for 13.45% of India's scheduled tribe population.

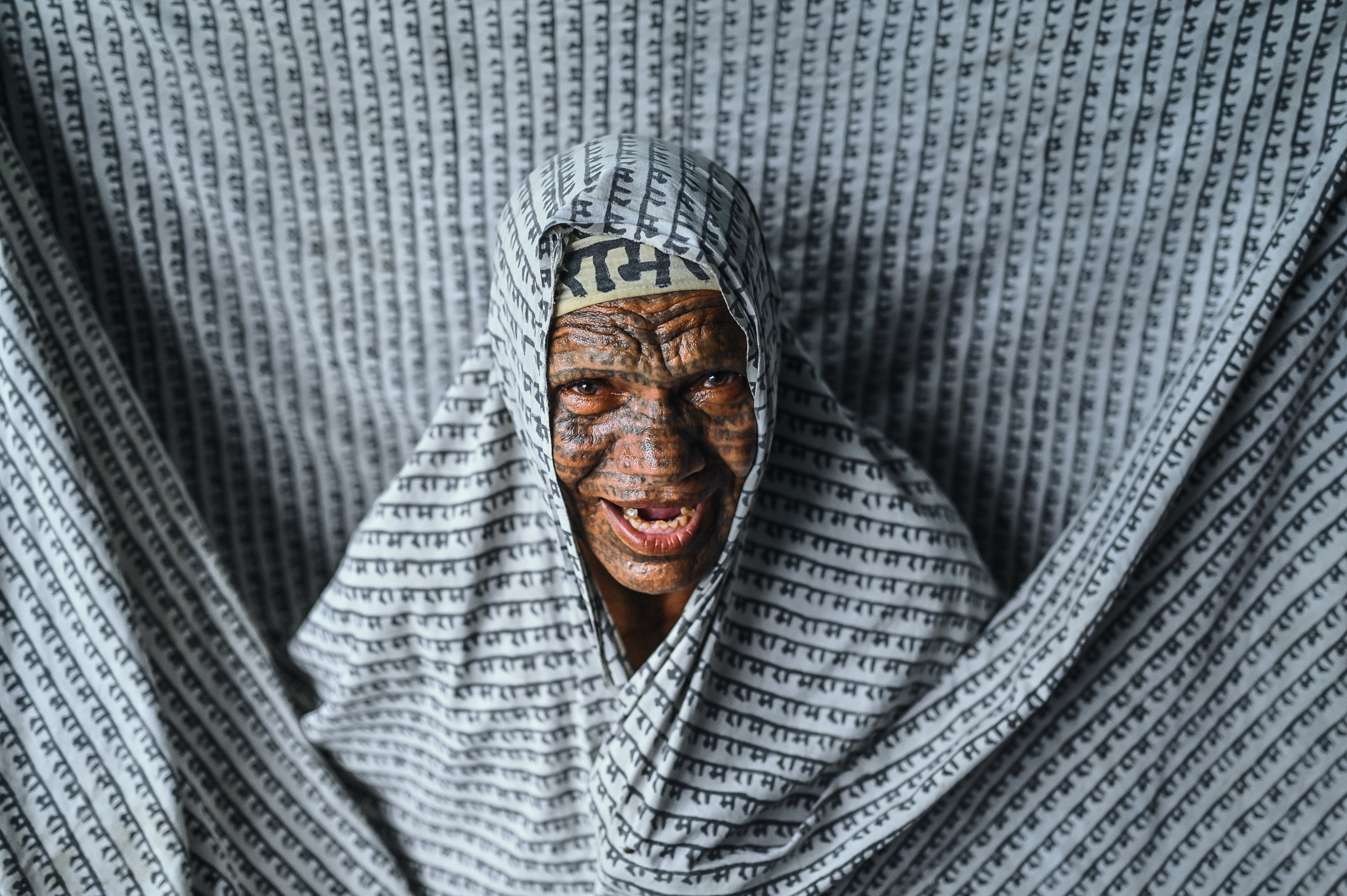
A member of the Ramnami Samaj, a movement among Dalits, whose members worship the Hindu deity Rama and tattoo their bodies with his name

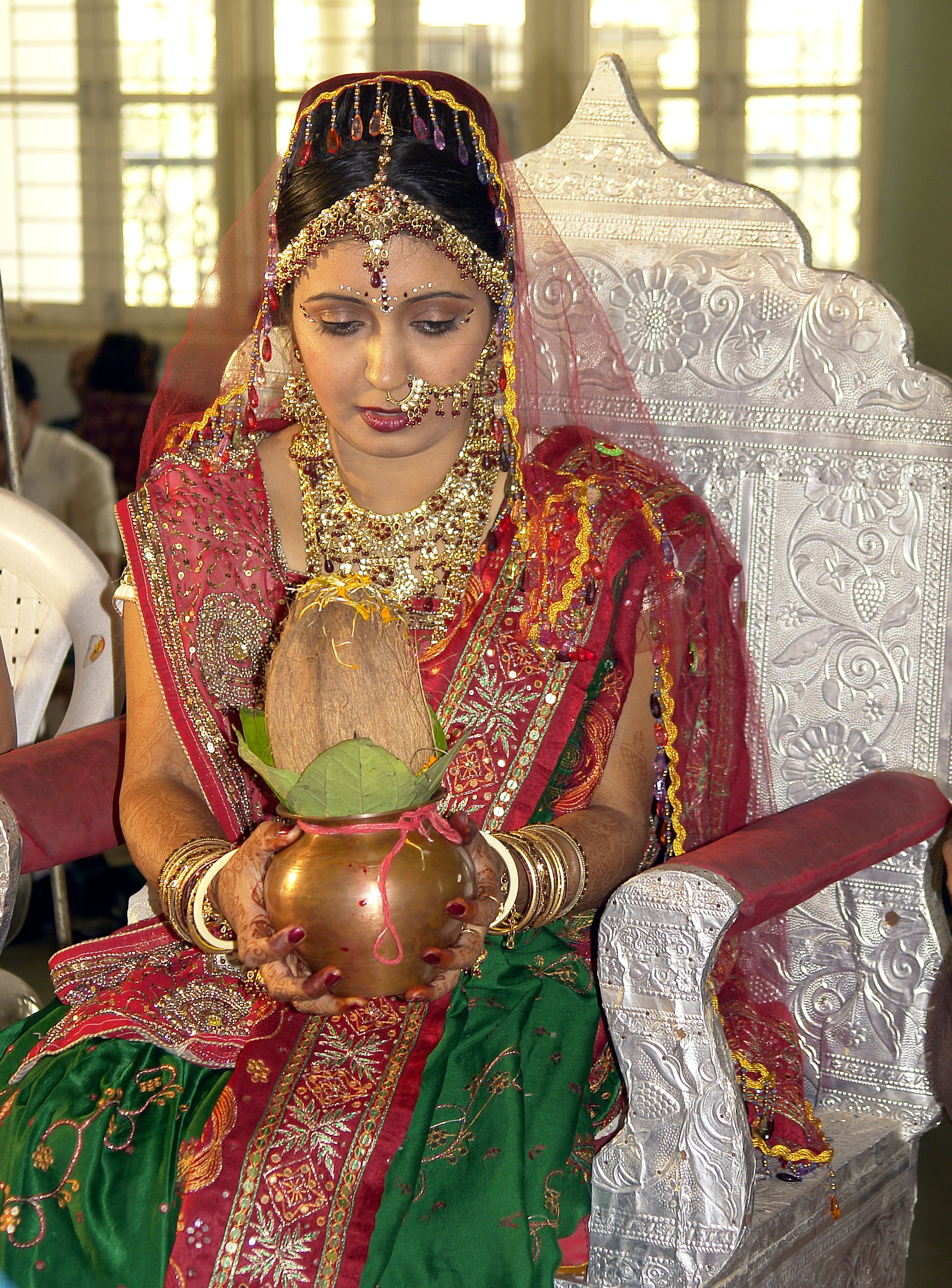
A Hindu bride, in Ahmedabad, Gujarat, during a marriage ritual (Note: "According to Gujarati traditional rituals, it is customary for a bride to present a coconut to the groom at the time of marriage and to be preserved by the respective husband throughout his life. It is given as a marriage proposal, a betrothal sign, a bride's welcome, and to protect against evil.")

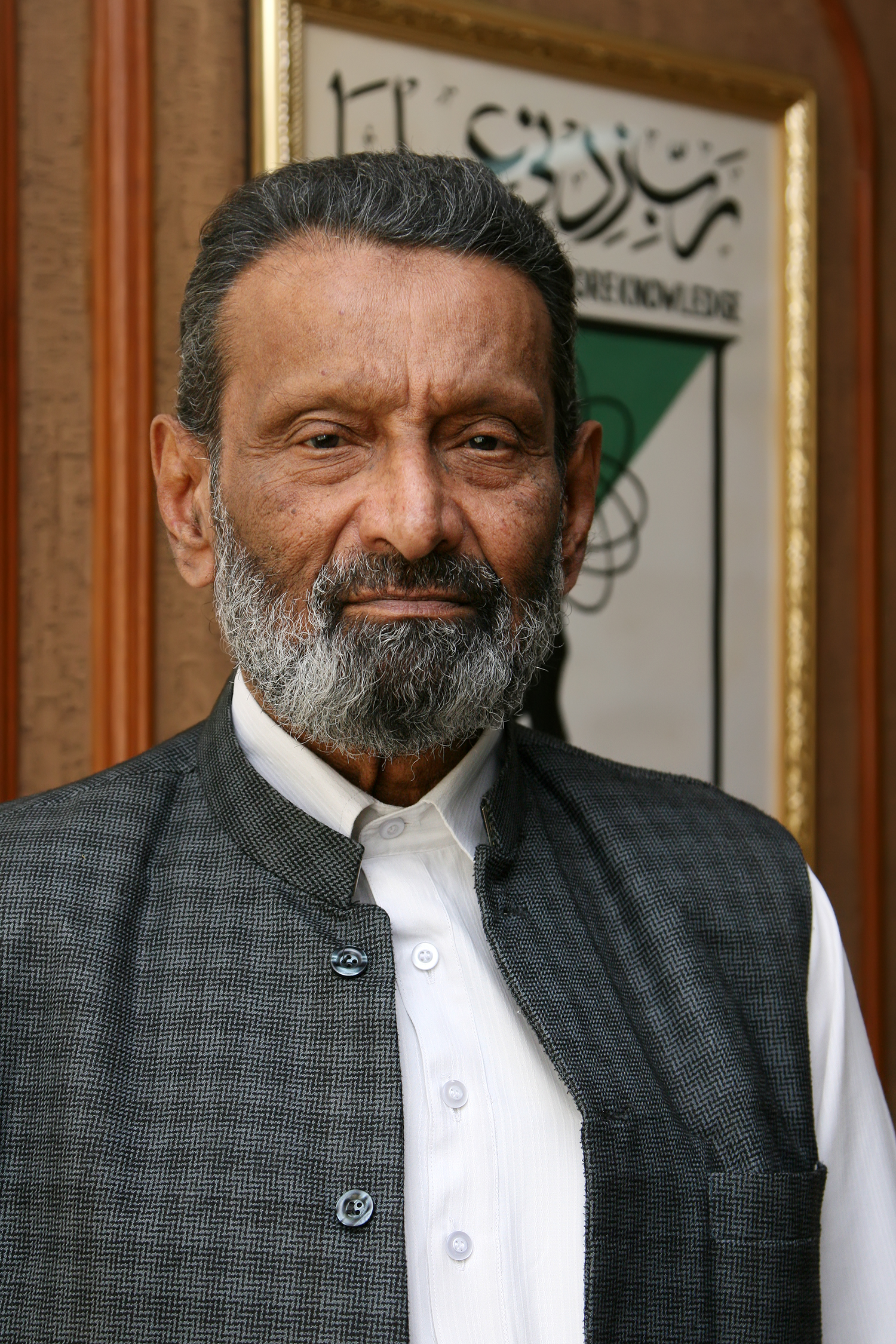
A benefactor of low-income Muslim education, Bangalore (Note: "In India, the Al-Ameen Movement helps in the education of the young in the socially and economically deprived sections of the society in the region of Bangalore.")

=== Visual art ===
India has a very ancient tradition of art, which has exchanged many influences with the rest of Eurasia, especially in the first millennium. During this period Buddhist art spread with Indian religions to Central, East and Southeast Asia, the last also greatly influenced by Hindu art. Thousands of seals from the Indus Valley Civilisation of the third millennium BCE have been found, usually carved with animals, but also some with human figures. The Pashupati seal, excavated in Mohenjo-daro, Pakistan, in 1928–29, is the best known. Virtually no art survives from a long period following the Indus Valley Civilisation. Almost all surviving ancient Indian art thereafter is in various forms of religious sculpture in durable materials, or coins. There was probably originally far more in wood, which is lost. In north India Mauryan art is the first imperial movement.

Over the following centuries a distinctly Indian style of sculpting the human figure developed, with less interest in articulating precise anatomy than ancient Greek sculpture but showing smoothly flowing forms expressing prana ("breath" or life-force). This is often complicated by the need to give figures multiple arms or heads, or represent different genders on the left and right of figures, as with the Ardhanarishvara form of Shiva and Parvati.

Most of the earliest large sculpture is Buddhist, either excavated from Buddhist stupas such as Sanchi, Sarnath and Amaravati, or is rock cut reliefs at sites such as Ajanta, Karla and Ellora. Hindu and Jain sites appear rather later. In spite of this complex mixture of religious traditions, generally, the prevailing artistic style at any time and place has been shared by the major religious groups, and sculptors probably usually served all communities. Gupta art, at its peak c. 300 CE – c. 500 CE, is often regarded as a classical period whose influence lingered for many centuries after; it saw a new dominance of Hindu sculpture, as at the Elephanta Caves. Across the north, this became rather stiff and formulaic after c. 800 CE, though rich with finely carved detail in the surrounds of statues. But in the South, under the Pallava and Chola dynasties, sculpture in both stone and bronze had a sustained period of great achievement; the large bronzes with Shiva as Nataraja have become an iconic symbol of India.

Ancient paintings have only survived at a few sites, of which the crowded scenes of court life in the Ajanta Caves are some of the most important. Painted manuscripts of religious texts survive from Eastern India from 10th century onwards, most of the earliest being Buddhist and later Jain. These significantly influenced later artistic styles. The Persian-derived Deccan painting, starting just before the Mughal miniature, between them give the first large body of secular painting, with an emphasis on portraits, and the recording of princely pleasures and wars. The style spread to Hindu courts, especially among the Rajputs, and developed a variety of styles, with the smaller courts often the most innovative, with figures such as Nihâl Chand and Nainsukh. As a market developed among European residents, it was supplied by Company painting by Indian artists with considerable Western influence. In the 19th century, cheap Kalighat paintings of gods and everyday life, done on paper, were urban folk art from Calcutta, which later saw the Bengal School of Art, reflecting the art colleges founded by the British, the first movement in modern Indian painting.

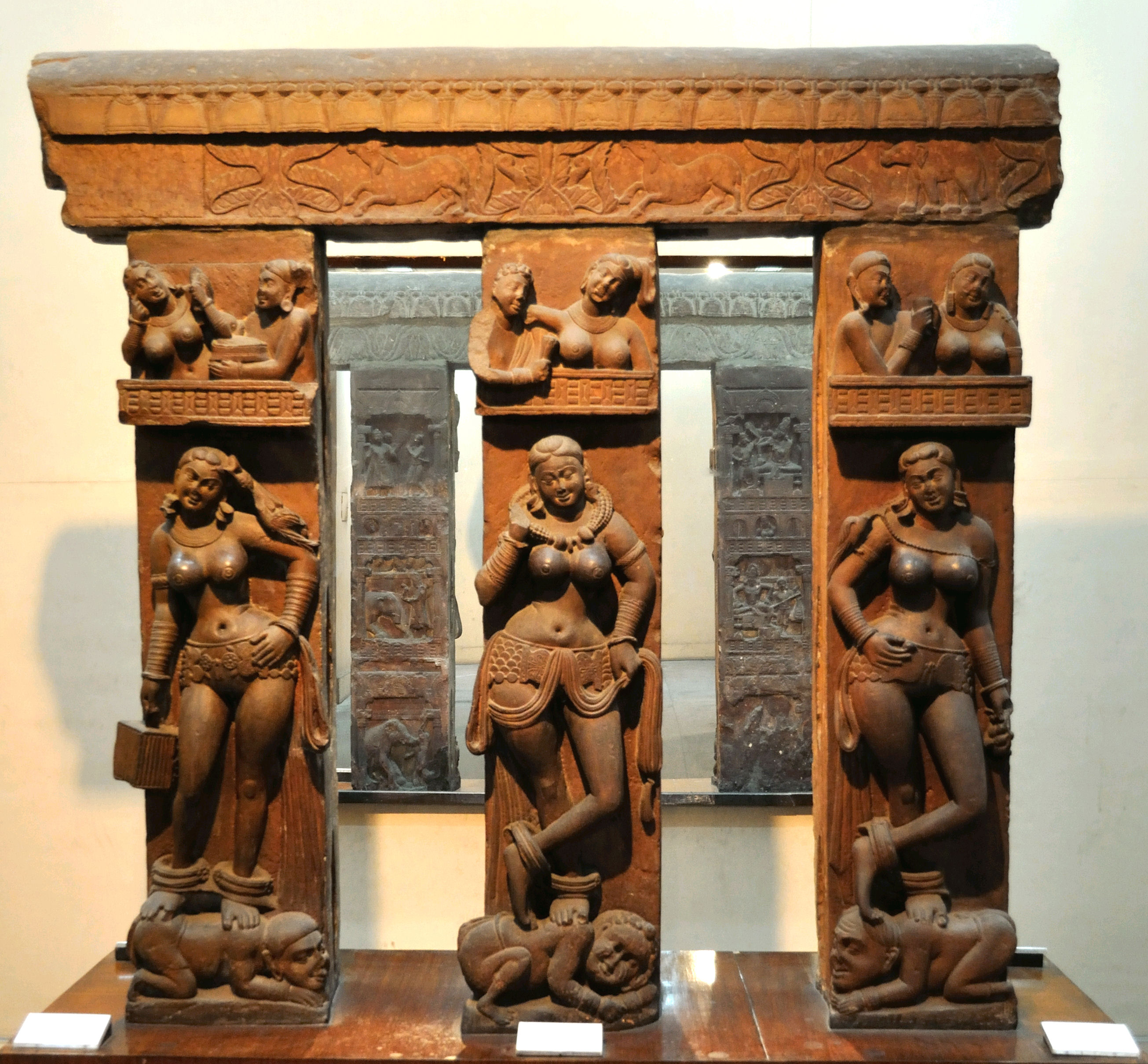
Bhutesvara Yakshis, Buddhist reliefs from Mathura, 2nd century CE

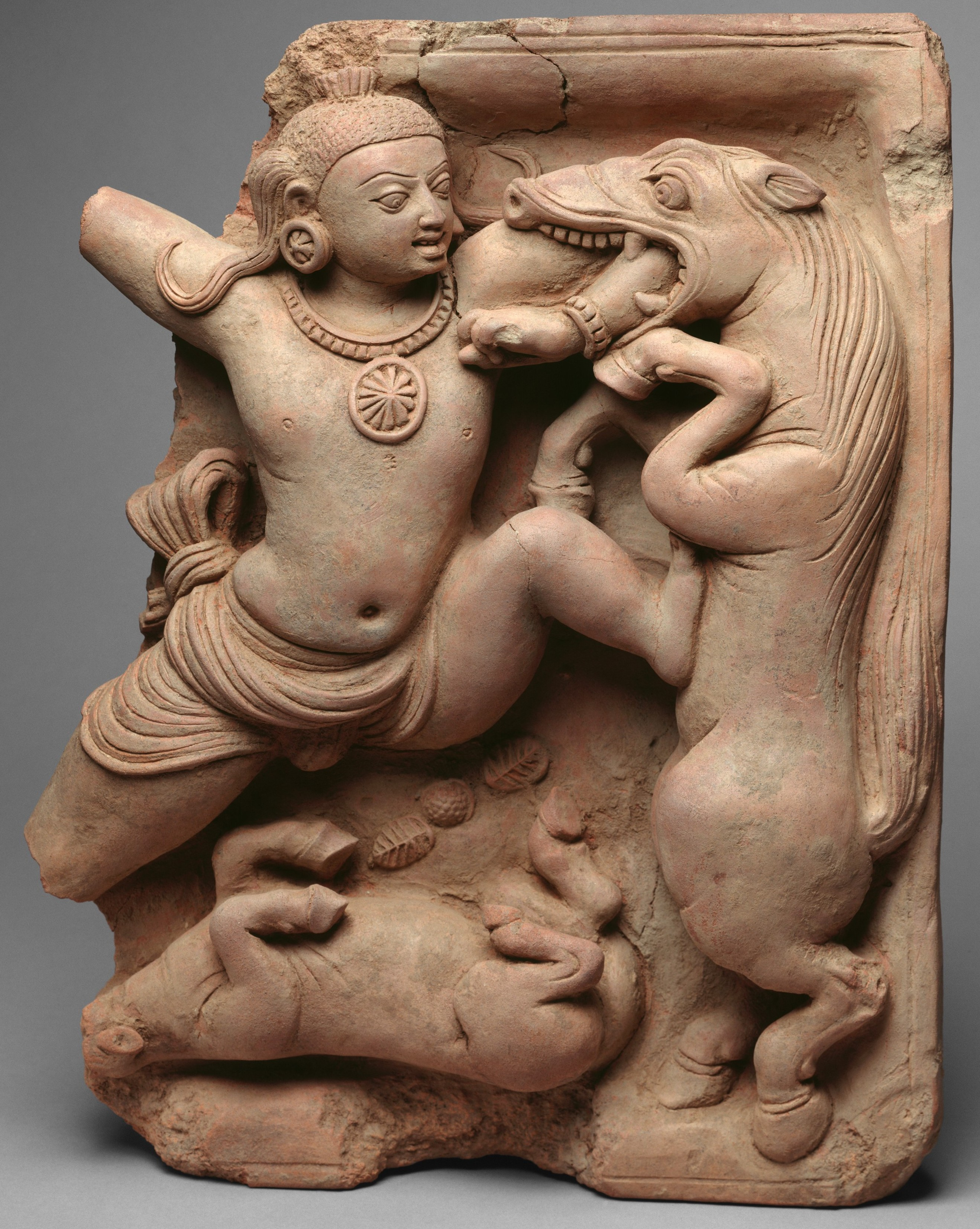
Gupta terracotta relief, Krishna Killing the Horse Demon Keshi, 5th century

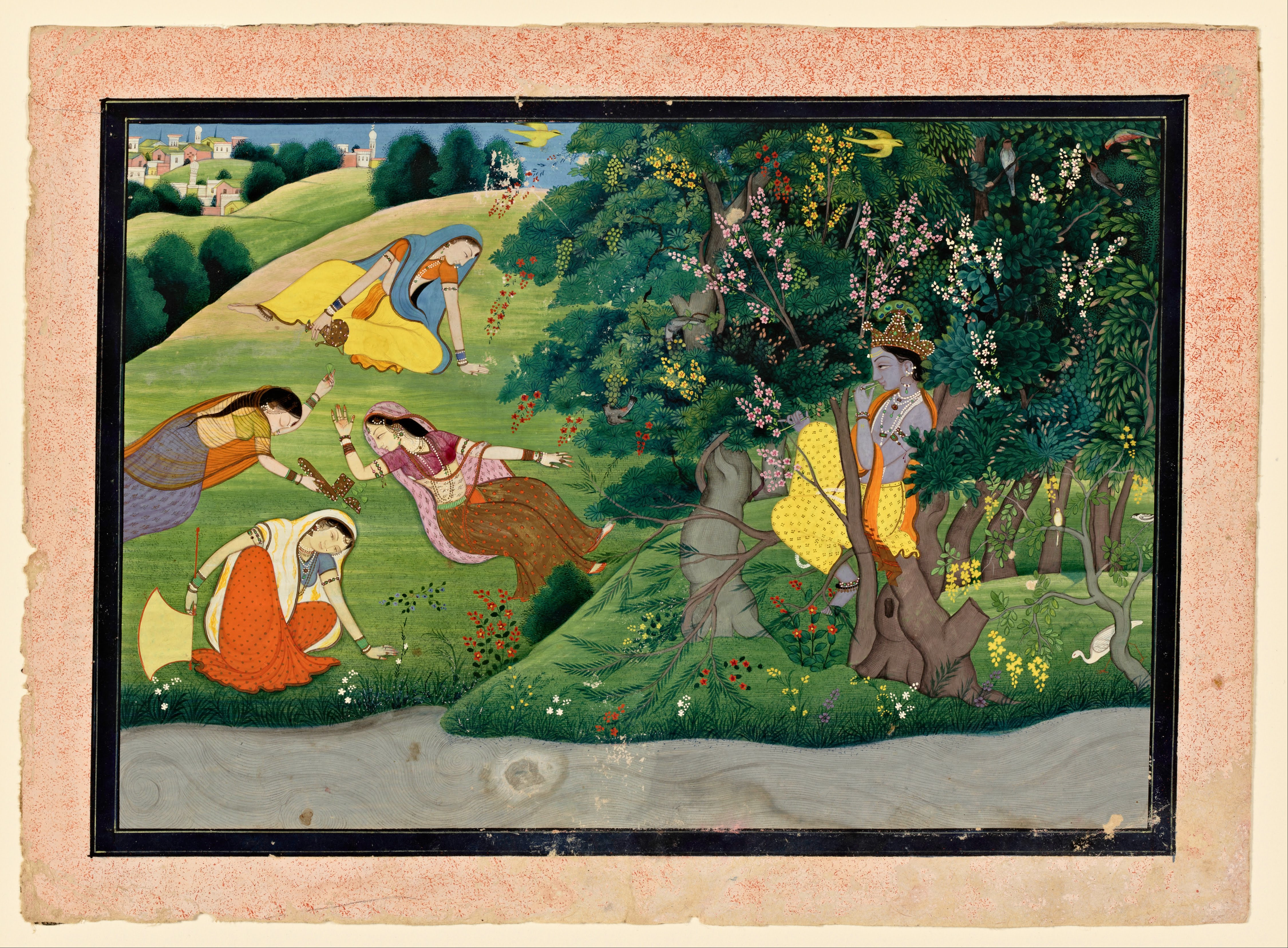
Krishna Fluting to the Milkmaids, Kangra painting, 1775–1785

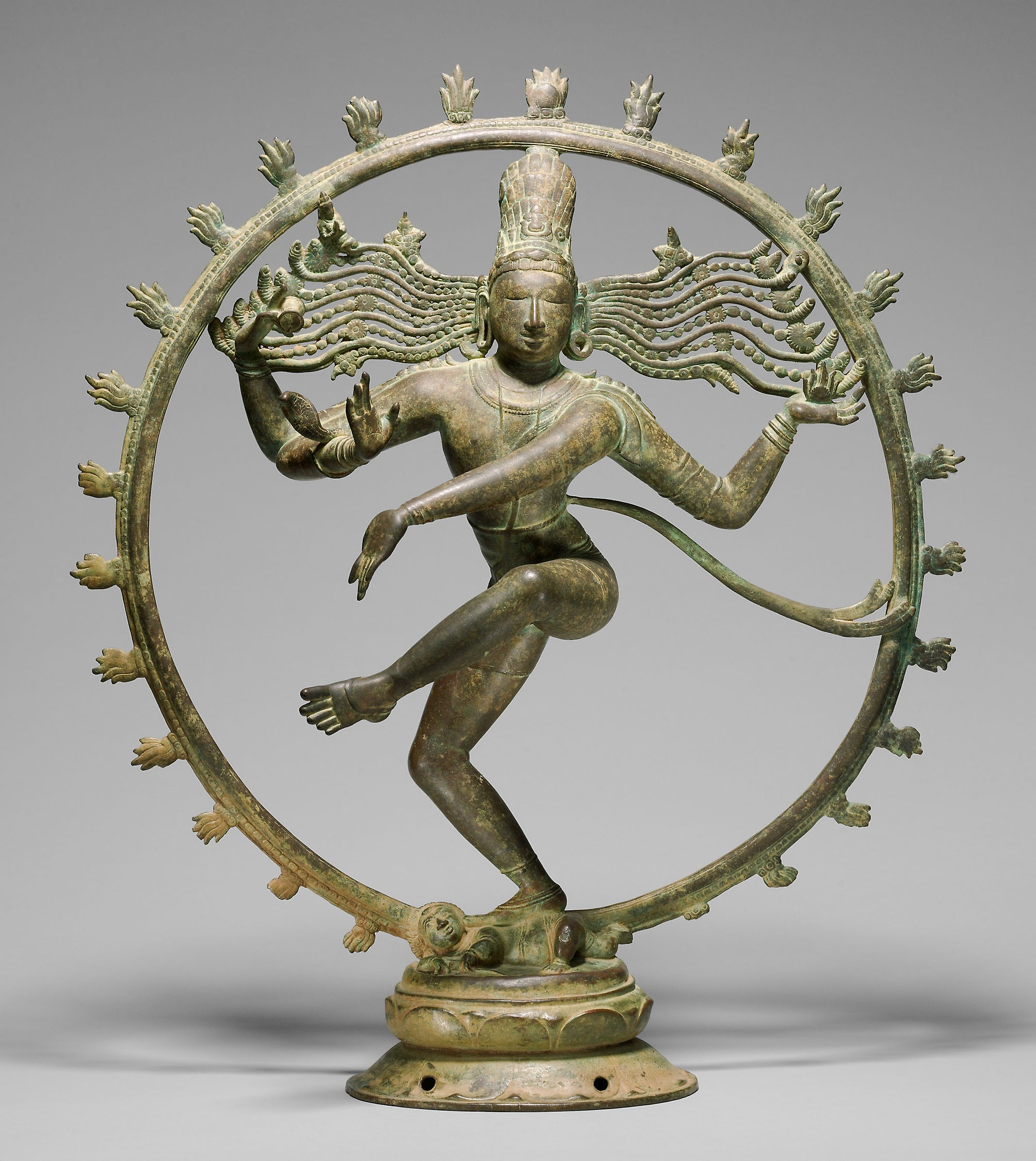
Chola bronze of Shiva as Nataraja ("Lord of Dance"), Tamil Nadu, 10th or 11th century

=== Mathematics ===
Significant mathematics began in India in the first millennium BCE. The Śulba Sūtras (literally, "Aphorisms of the Chords" in Vedic Sanskrit) (c. 700–400 BCE) contain the earliest extant verbal expression of the Pythagorean theorem (although very likely it had been known to the Old Babylonians.) (Note: Ancient and medieval Indian mathematical works, all composed in Sanskrit usually consisted of two sections: sutras in which a set of rules or problems were stated with economy in verse, and a prose commentary that explained the problem in more detail and provided justification for the solution.) All mathematical works were orally transmitted until approximately 500 BCE; thereafter, they were transmitted both orally and in manuscript form. The oldest extant mathematical document produced on the Indian subcontinent is the birch bark Bakhshali manuscript from the 7th century CE.

During the classical period of Indian mathematics (400 CE to 1200 CE), Aryabhata, Brahmagupta, Bhaskara II, Varāhamihira, and Madhava made important contributions. The decimal number system in use today was first recorded in Indian mathematics. Indian mathematicians made early contributions to the study of the concept of zero as a number, negative numbers, arithmetic, and algebra. Trigonometry was further advanced in India, and the modern definitions of sine and cosine were developed there. These mathematical concepts were transmitted to the Middle East, China, and Europe. A later landmark in Indian mathematics was the development of the series expansions for trigonometric functions (sine, cosine, and arc tangent) by mathematicians of the Kerala school in the 15th century CE. Their work, completed two centuries before the invention of calculus in Europe, provided the first example of a power series. (Note: Apart from geometric series) In the modern era, Srinivasa Ramanujan made fundamental contributions to number theory.

=== Music ===
India contains a wide array of musical practices, including many different folk musics from different regions. Indian classical music has Vedic origins, and split in the 13th century into the two main traditions of Hindustani and Carnatic music. Hindustani is associated with North India and is more improvisational, featuring instruments such as the sitar and tabla, and Carnatic is South Indian and more focused on written compositions such as the kriti, while both styles contain common elements such as the raga melodic framework and tala rhythmic meter. Indian music has influenced western genres, including rock and jazz musicians during the 1960s counterculture.

Indian film music is music written for Indian cinema, generally composed by music directors and sung by playback singers. Modern Indian pop takes influences from classical, folk, and western pop music.

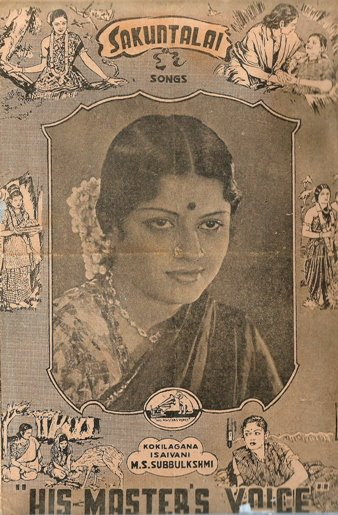
M. S. Subbulakshmi, Carnatic music vocalist

A short documentary on Indian classical music and some instruments: Veena, Sitar, Tabla, and Bansuri

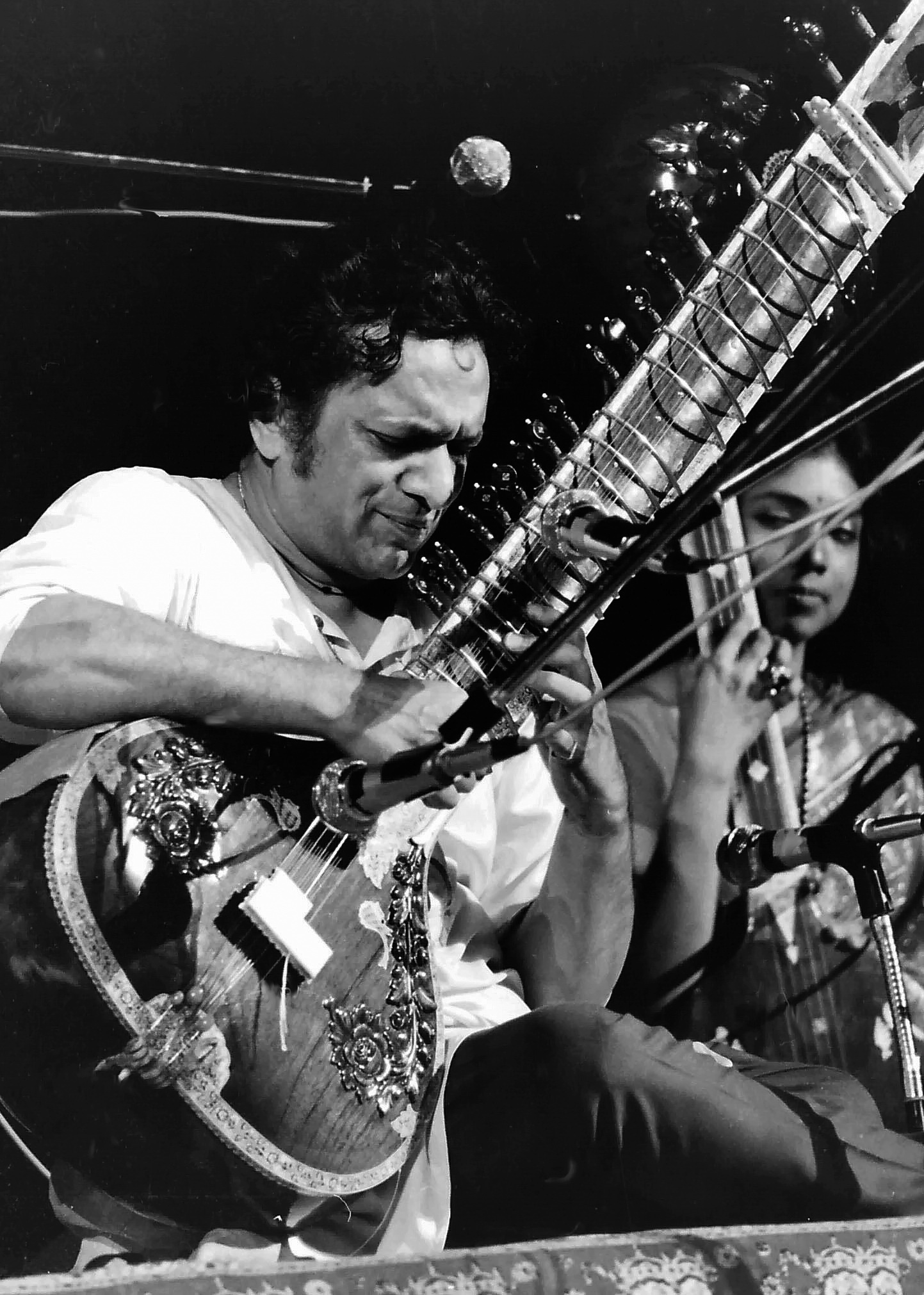
Ravi Shankar at the Woodstock music festival, 1969

=== Dance ===
Dance in India draws heavily on Indian classical dance traditions. Many of these in turn arose in temples or other religious contexts. However, their sponsorship and promotion have continued in secular, modern India. (Note: Among young urban middle-class women, for example, a proficiency in classical dance is sometimes a sought-after social achievement.) India also has local and modern dance traditions. Whether a dance is classical is determined by the Sangeet Natak Academi, the Indian government's organisation for performing arts. (Note: The classical status increases a dance's visibility and attracts more funding from agencies and ticket purchases from audiences.) Although more dances could perhaps meet the criteria for classical, the Akademi has chosen eight. (Note: Given the geographical distribution of the chosen dances and their stylistic range, the choices could be seen as a facet of India's ethos of national integration.)

Classical Dances of India
Dance	Origin state	Region	Type or origin	Musical accompaniment
Bharatanatyam	Tamil Nadu	South India	Temple dance	Cinna Melam, Carnatic music
Kathak	Uttar Pradesh	North India	Historical dance	Hindustani music
Kathakali	Kerala	South India	Dance-drama	Madhalam drum ensembles; Sopana vocal music
Kuchipudi	Andhra Pradesh	South India	Dance-drama	Carnatic music ensemble
Manipuri	Manipur	Northeast India	Temple/ritual dance	Ensemble comprising Pung Cholom, flutes, trumpets, Tambura, Pena, and cymbals
Mohiniattam	Kerala	South India	Dance-drama	Carnatic ensemble
Odissi	Odisha	East India	Temple dance	Ensemble of Hindustani music instruments: pakhavaj, sitar, flute, cymbals, harmonium
Sattriya	Assam	Northeast India	Dance-drama	Borgeet accompanied by khol drums and cymbals.

The best-known classical dance is Bharatanatyam, which began as temple dances performed by Tamil devadasis. Identified with "prostitutes and courtesans", their dancing was formally banned in 1947. (Note: As per the Madras Devadasis (Prevention of Dedication) Act, after agitation from the Indian middle and upper classes.) Concurrently, the dance was rehabilitated as a "pure" art form, with Rukmini Devi Arundale as a prominent figure. A devdasi who went on to attain national and international prominence was Thanjavur Balasaraswati. Some sources consider the dance-dramas Chhau of Jharkhand, West Bengal, and Odisha and Yakshagana of Karnataka to also belong to the classical tradition.

Local dance traditions vary widely across India. In addition to the dance-dramas Chhau and Yakshagana, they include dance-dramas Raslila of western Uttar Pradesh and Terukkuttu of Tamil Nadu; calendrical and festival dances such as the Bhangra of Punjab, especially at Vaisakhi, the onset of spring, and Garba of Gujarat during Navratri; and tribal or Adivasi dances, such as those of the Santal and Toda people, the latter, for example, in honour of the god Ön who brought buffalo to earth.

Among 20th-century directions is the modern dance of Uday Shankar in which classical styles were employed but not adhered to rigidly. Examples are dance-dramas based on the ancient Indian animal fables, Panchatantra, and Nehru's mid-century meditation on Indian history, The Discovery of India. Dance has been an essential aspect of Indian films from the first talkies of the 1930s. Individual and group dances in Bollywood, for example, show a broad range of influences, including classical, local, and Western popular dance. Towards the end of the 20th century, innovations in British South Asian music and dance, such as Post-Bhangra, fed back into dance in India.

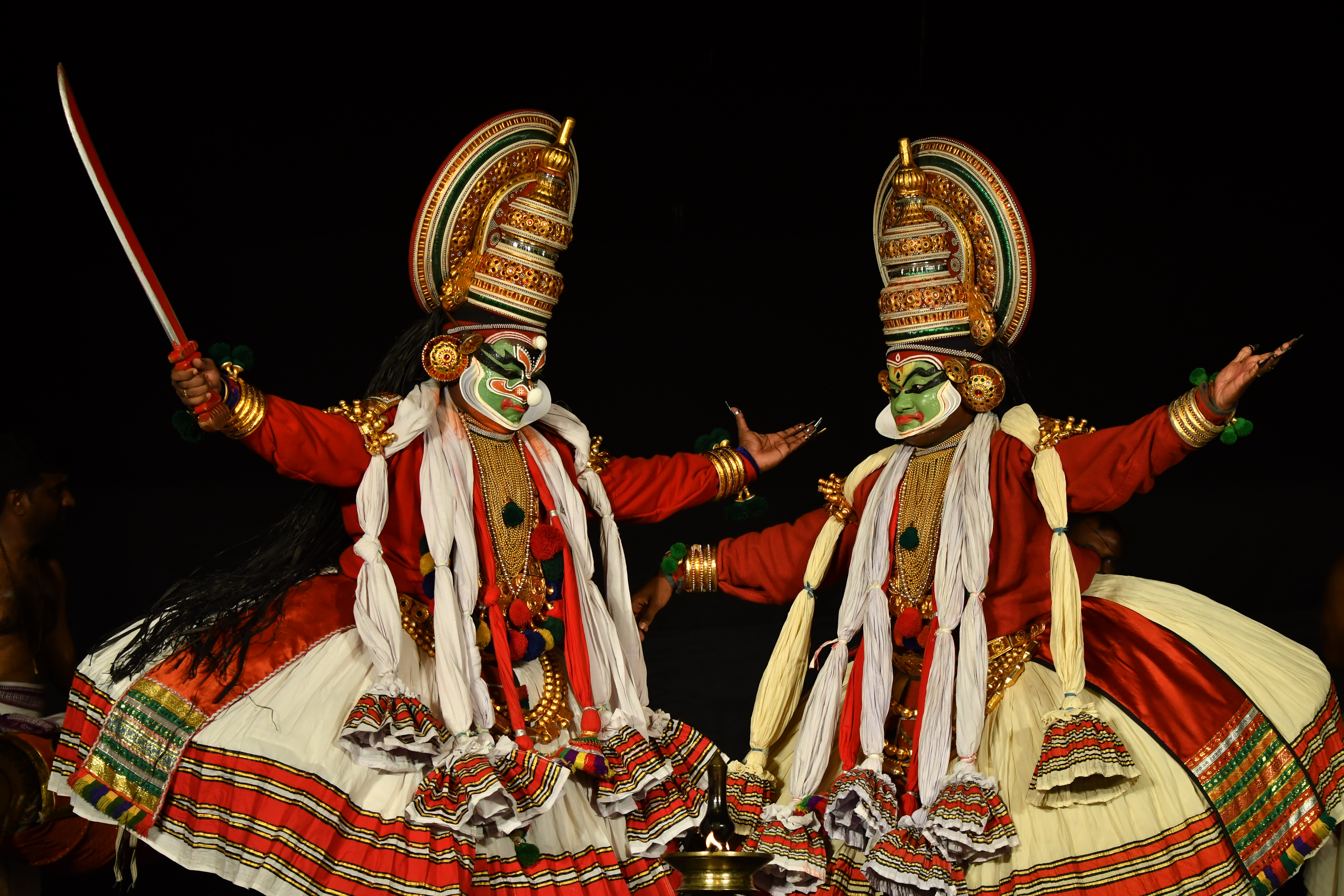
The Kathakali dance of Kerala

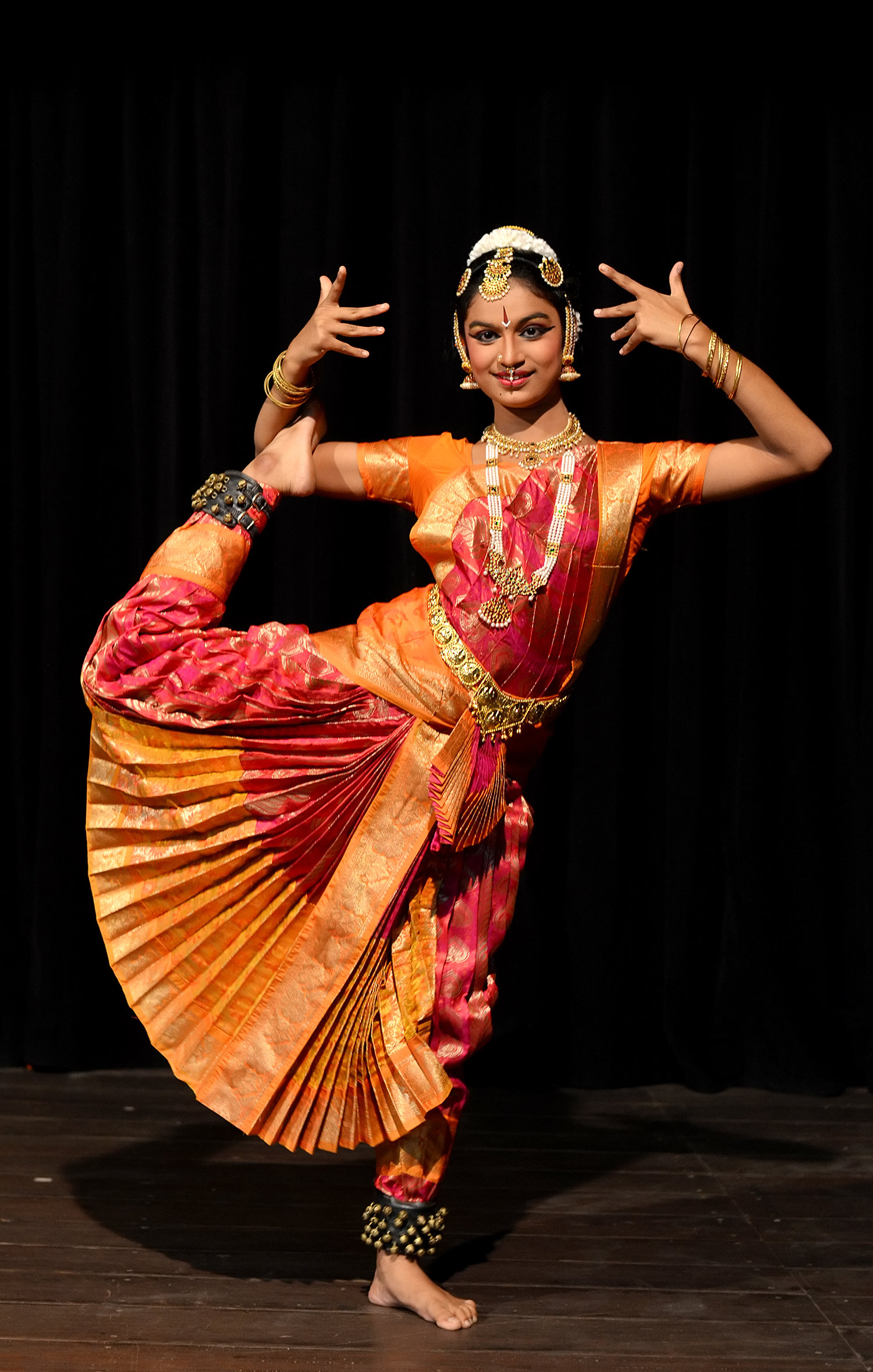
The Bharatanatyam dance of Tamil Nadu

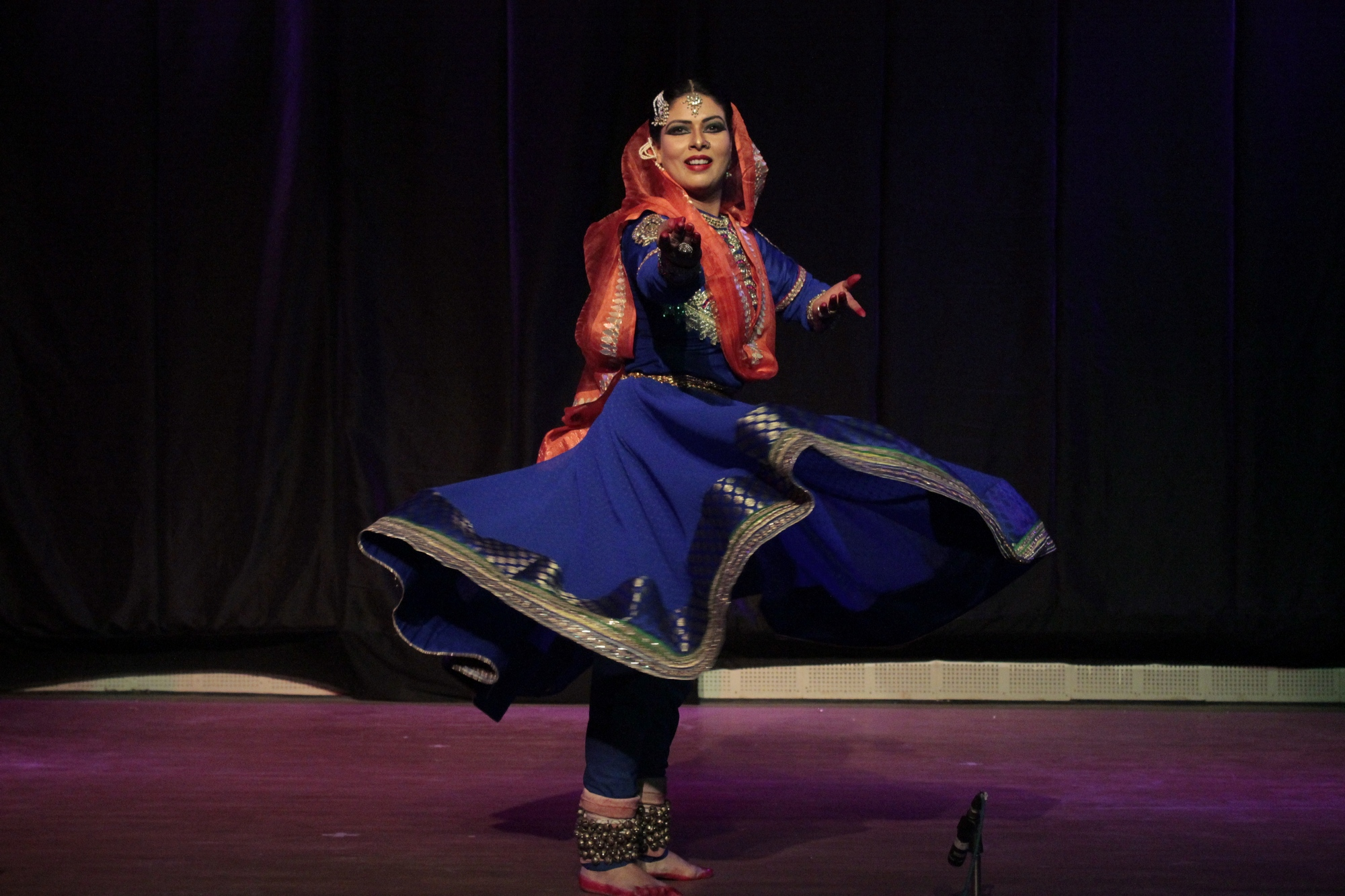
The Kathak dance of northern India absorbed Persian and Central Asian influences during Mughal rule.

=== Clothing ===
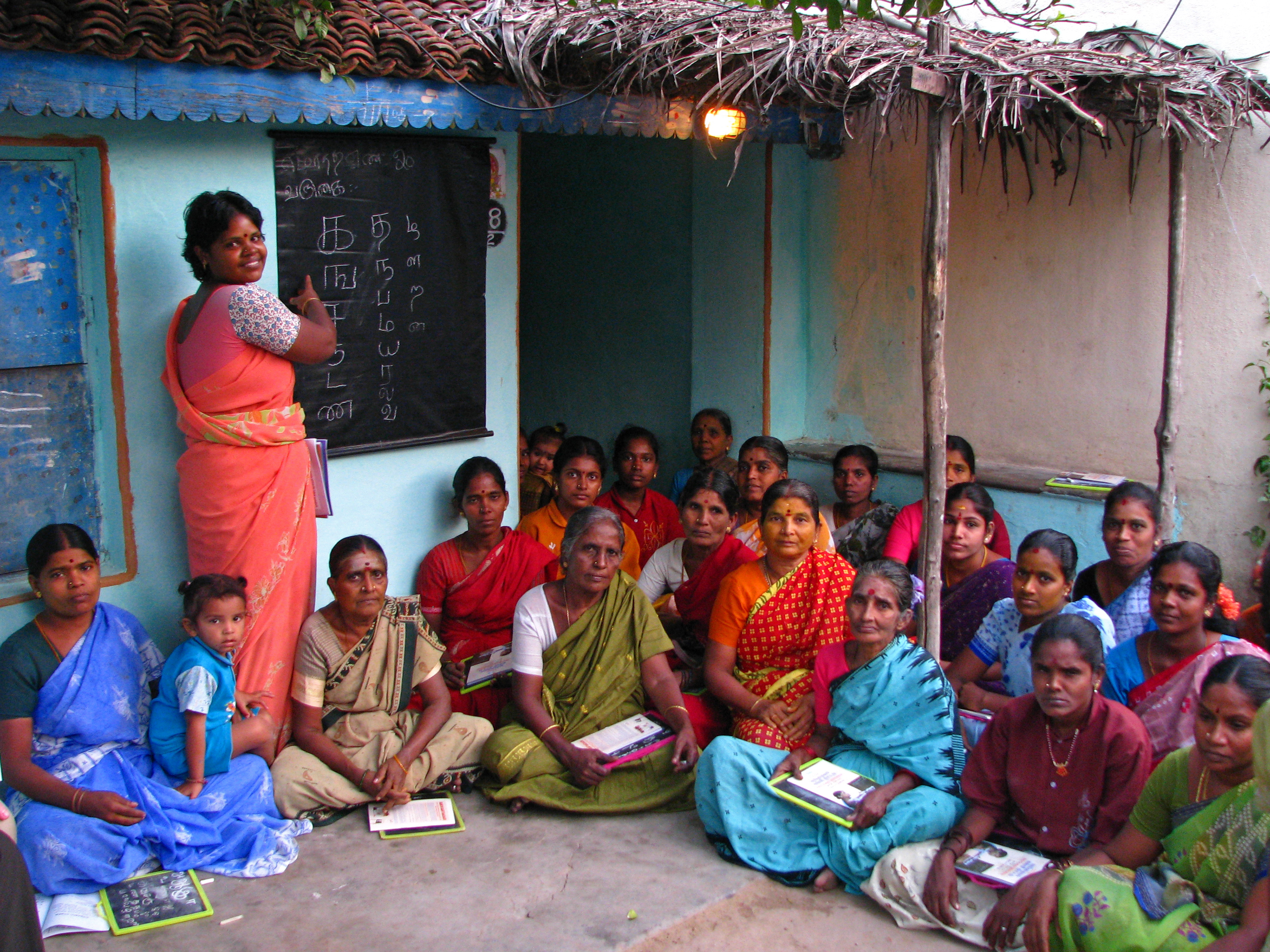
Women in sari at an adult literacy class in Tamil Nadu

From ancient times until the advent of the modern era, the most widely worn traditional dress in India was draped. For women, it took the form of a sari, a single piece of cloth many yards long. The sari was traditionally wrapped around the lower body and the shoulder. In its modern form, it is combined with an underskirt, or Indian petticoat, and tucked in along the waistband for more secure fastening. It is also commonly worn with an Indian blouse, or choli, which serves as the primary upper-body garment; the sari's end passes over the shoulder, covering the midriff and obscuring the upper body's contours. For men, a similar but shorter length of cloth, the dhoti, has served as a lower-body garment.

The use of stitched clothes became widespread after Muslim rule was established by the Delhi Sultanate (c. 1300 CE) and continued by the Mughal Empire (c. 1525 CE). Among the garments introduced during this time and still commonly worn are: the shalwars and pyjamas, both styles of trousers, and the tunics kurta and kameez. Shalwars are atypically wide at the waist but narrow to a cuffed bottom. A drawstring holds them up, causing them to pleat at the waist. When the pants are cut quite narrow, on the bias, they are called churidars. The kameez is a long shirt or tunic. Its side seams left open below the waistline. The kurta is traditionally collarless and made of cotton or silk; it is worn plain or with embroidered decoration, such as chikankari; and typically falls to either just above or just below the wearer's knees.

In the last 50 years, fashion in India has changed a great deal. In urban northern India, the sari is increasingly no longer everyday wear, though it remains popular on formal occasions. Younger urban women rarely wear the traditional shalwar kameez, favouring churidars or jeans. In office settings, ubiquitous air conditioning allows men to wear sports jackets year-round. For weddings and formal occasions, men in the middle and upper classes often wear bandhgala, or short Nehru jackets, with pants, with the groom and his groomsmen sporting sherwanis and churidars.

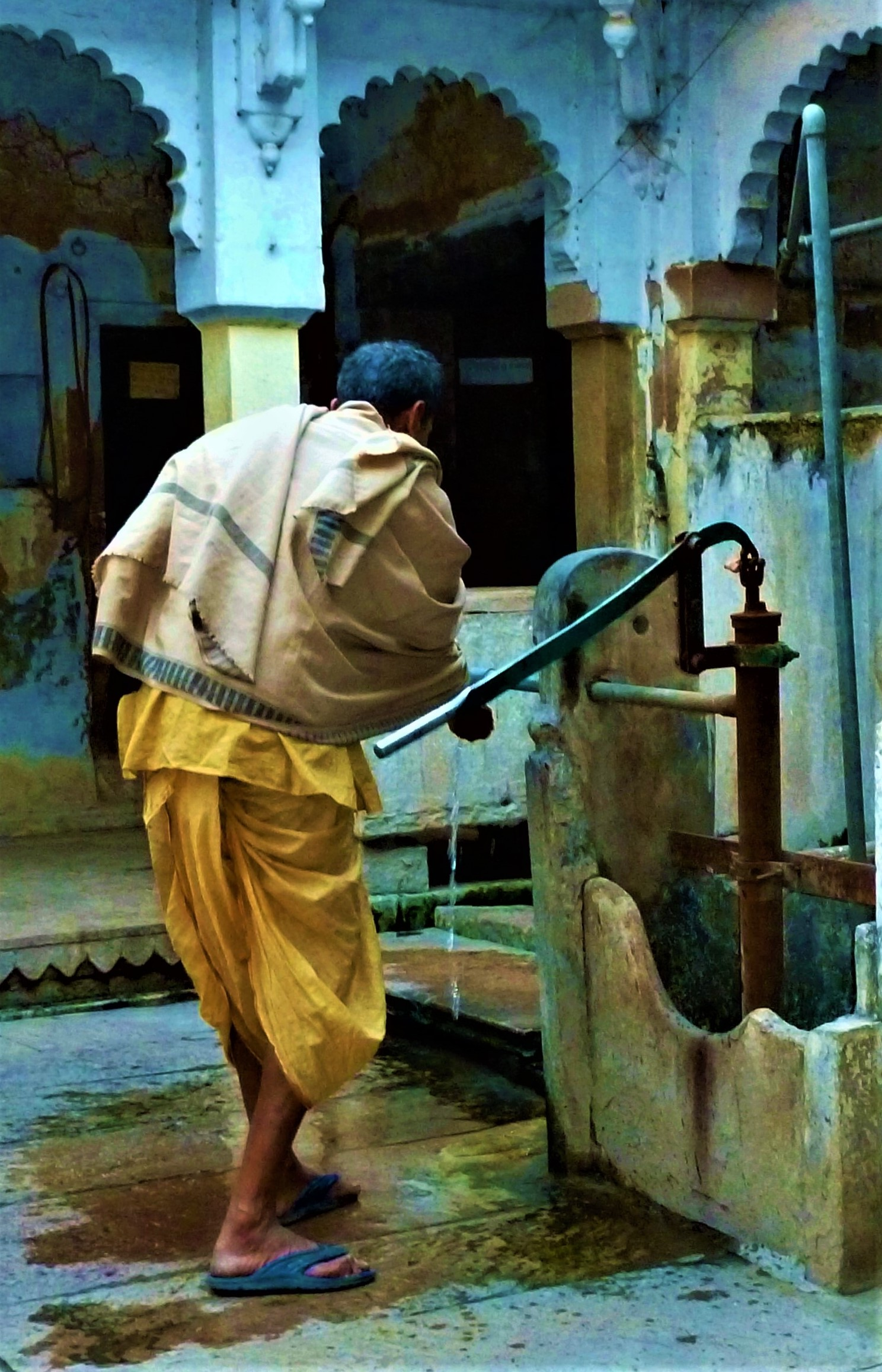
A man in dhoti and woollen shawl in Varanasi

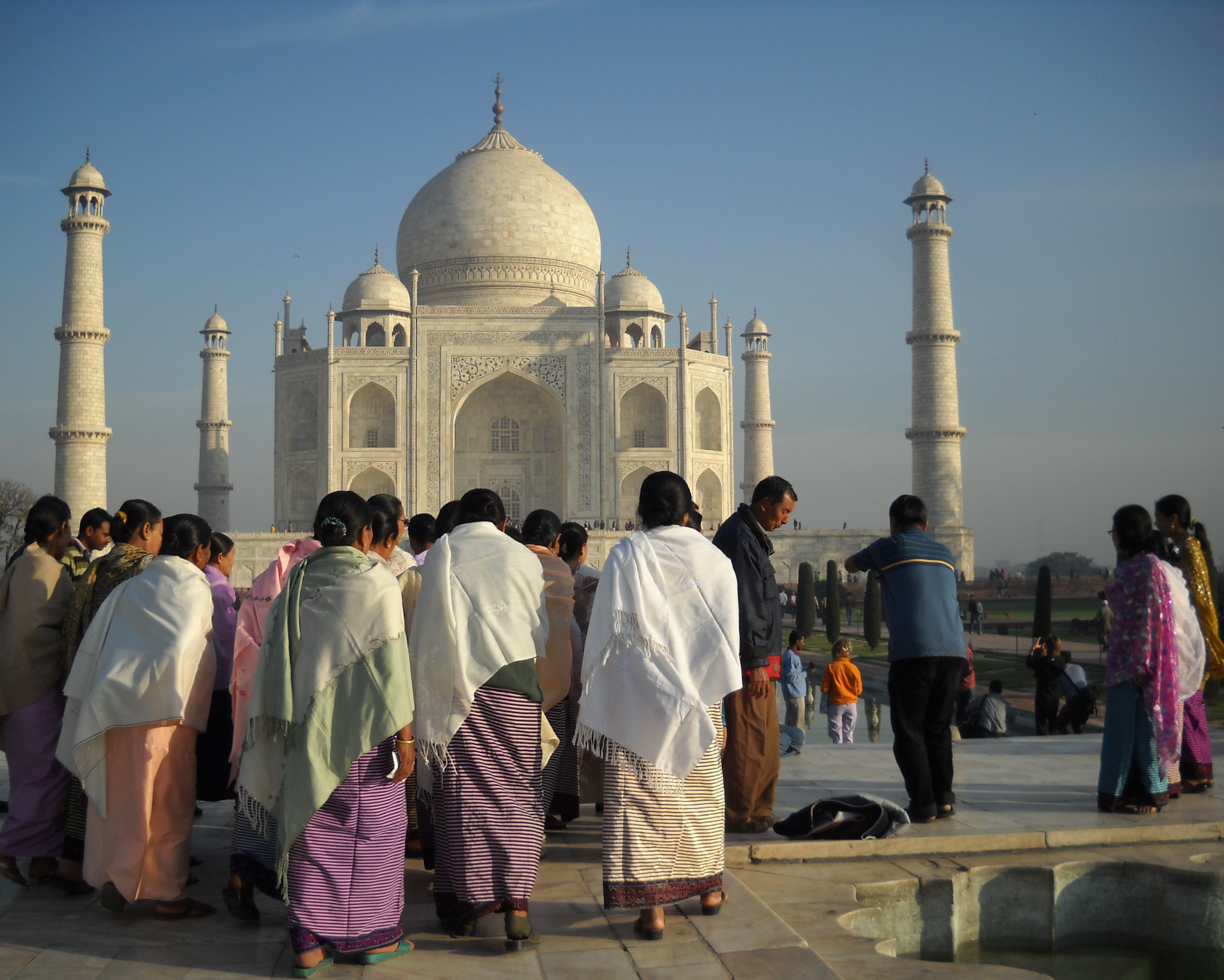
Female tourists from Manipur in shawl and phanek—a lower-body garment similar to a sarong

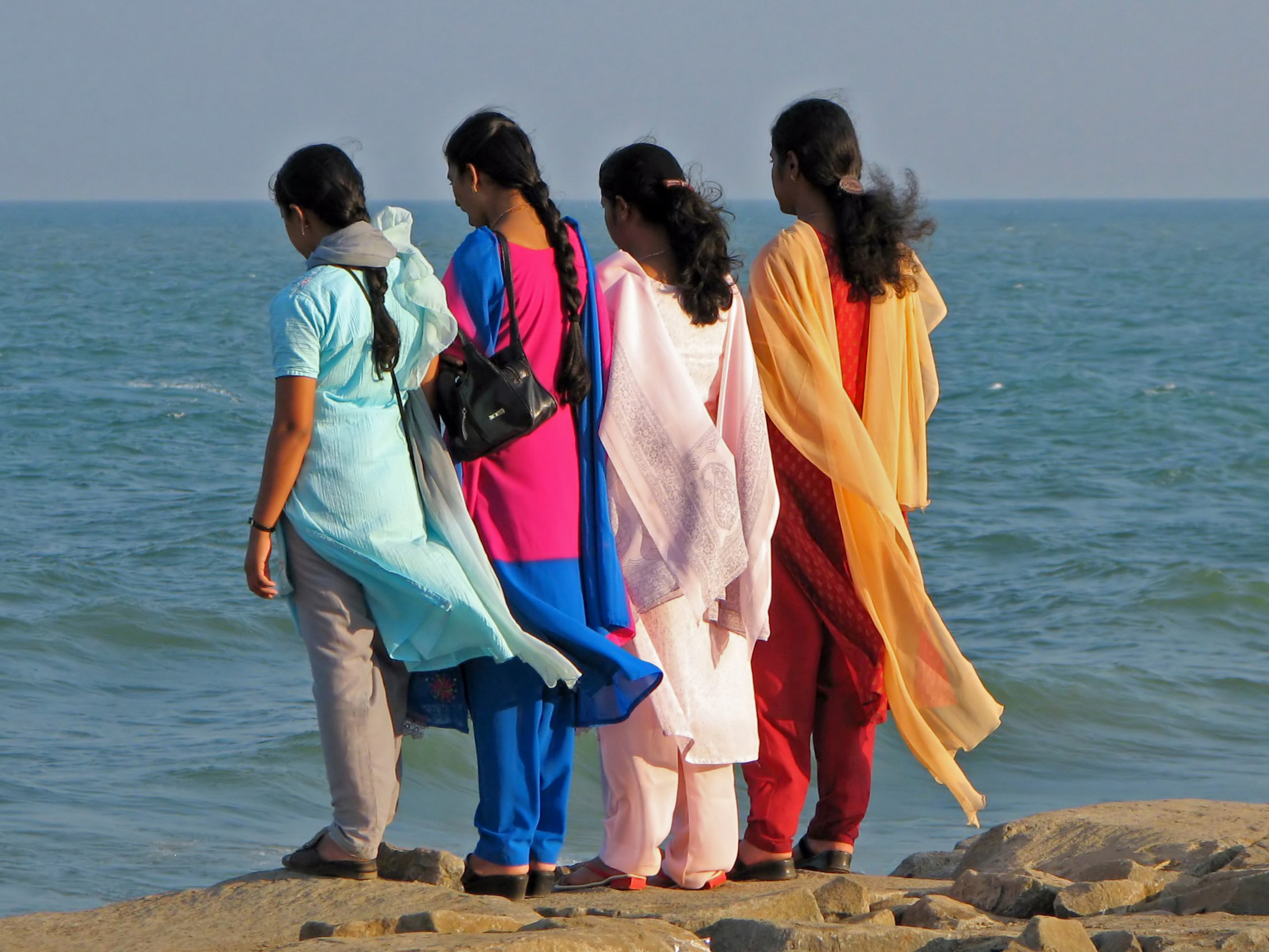
Women in shalwar-kameez in Puducherry

=== Cuisine ===
A tandoor chef in Turkman Gate, Old Delhi, makes khameri roti, a Muslim-influenced style of leavened bread. (Note: The Central Asian custom of buying bread outside the home came to India with the Mughals.)

A typical Indian meal is built on a plain cereal, complemented by savoury dishes. The cooked cereal could be steamed rice; chapati, a thin unleavened bread; idli, a steamed breakfast cake; or dosa, a griddled pancake. The savoury dishes might include lentils, pulses, vegetables, meat, poultry and fish commonly spiced with ginger and garlic, but also coriander, cumin, turmeric, cinnamon, cardamom and others. In some instances, the ingredients may be mixed during the cooking process. India has distinctive vegetarian cuisines, each a feature of the geographical and cultural histories of its communities. About 20% to 39% of India's population consists of vegetarians. Although meat is eaten widely, the proportional consumption of meat is low.

The most significant import of cooking techniques into India during the last millennium occurred during the Mughal Empire, spreading into northern India from regions to its northwest, along with dishes such as pilaf. Onions, garlic, almonds, and spices were added to the simple yogurt marinade of Persia. Rice was partially cooked and layered alternately with sauteed meat, the pot sealed tightly, and slow cooked according to another Persian cooking technique, to produce biryani, a feature of festive dining in many parts of India.

The diversity of Indian food served worldwide has been partially concealed by the dominance of Punjabi cuisine. The popularity of tandoori chicken—cooked in a tandoor oven, which had traditionally been used for baking bread in the rural Punjab and the Delhi region, especially among Muslims, but which is originally from Central Asia—dates to the 1950s, and was caused in large part by an entrepreneurial response among people from the Punjab who had been displaced by the 1947 partition.

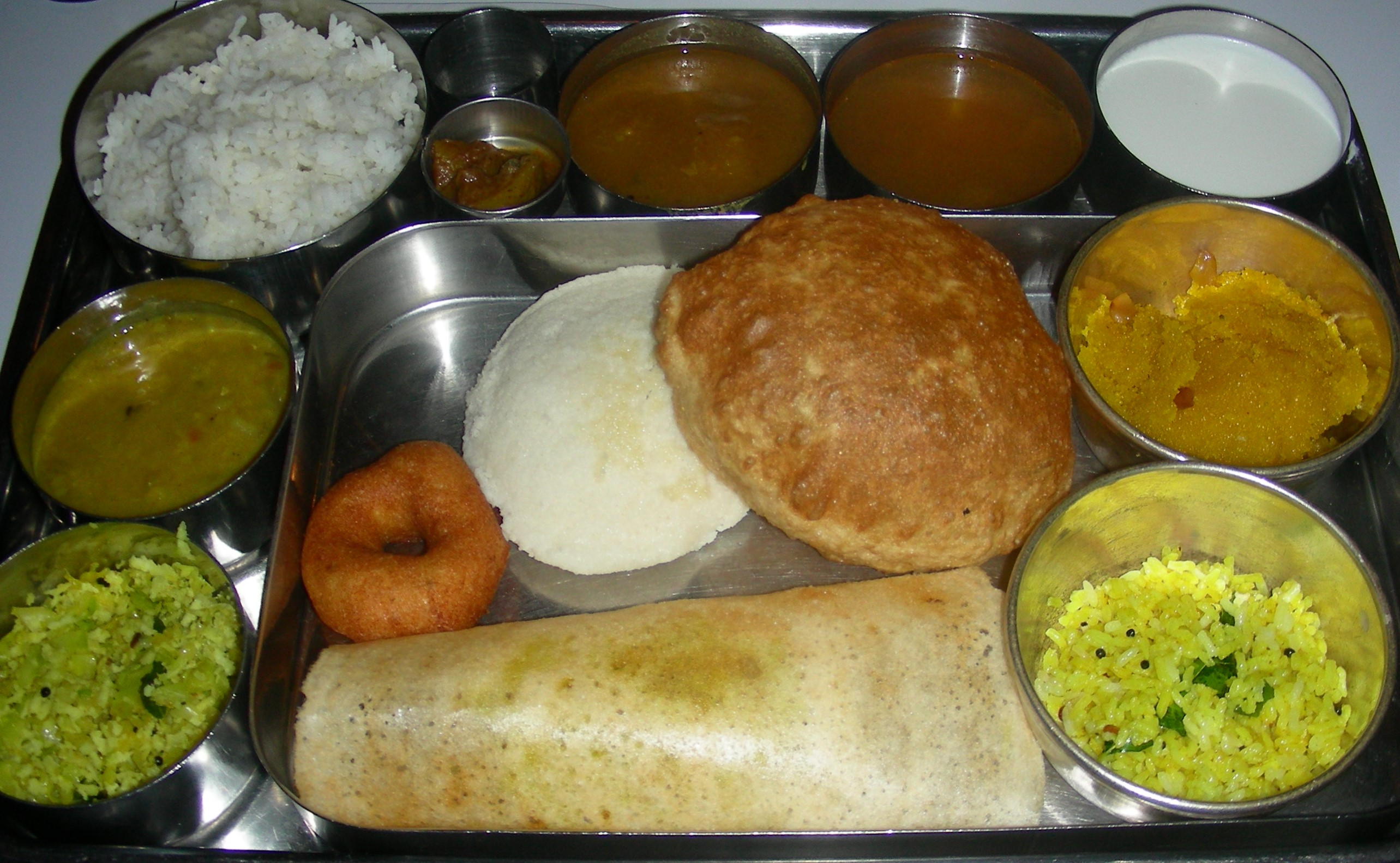
South Indian vegetarian thali, or platter

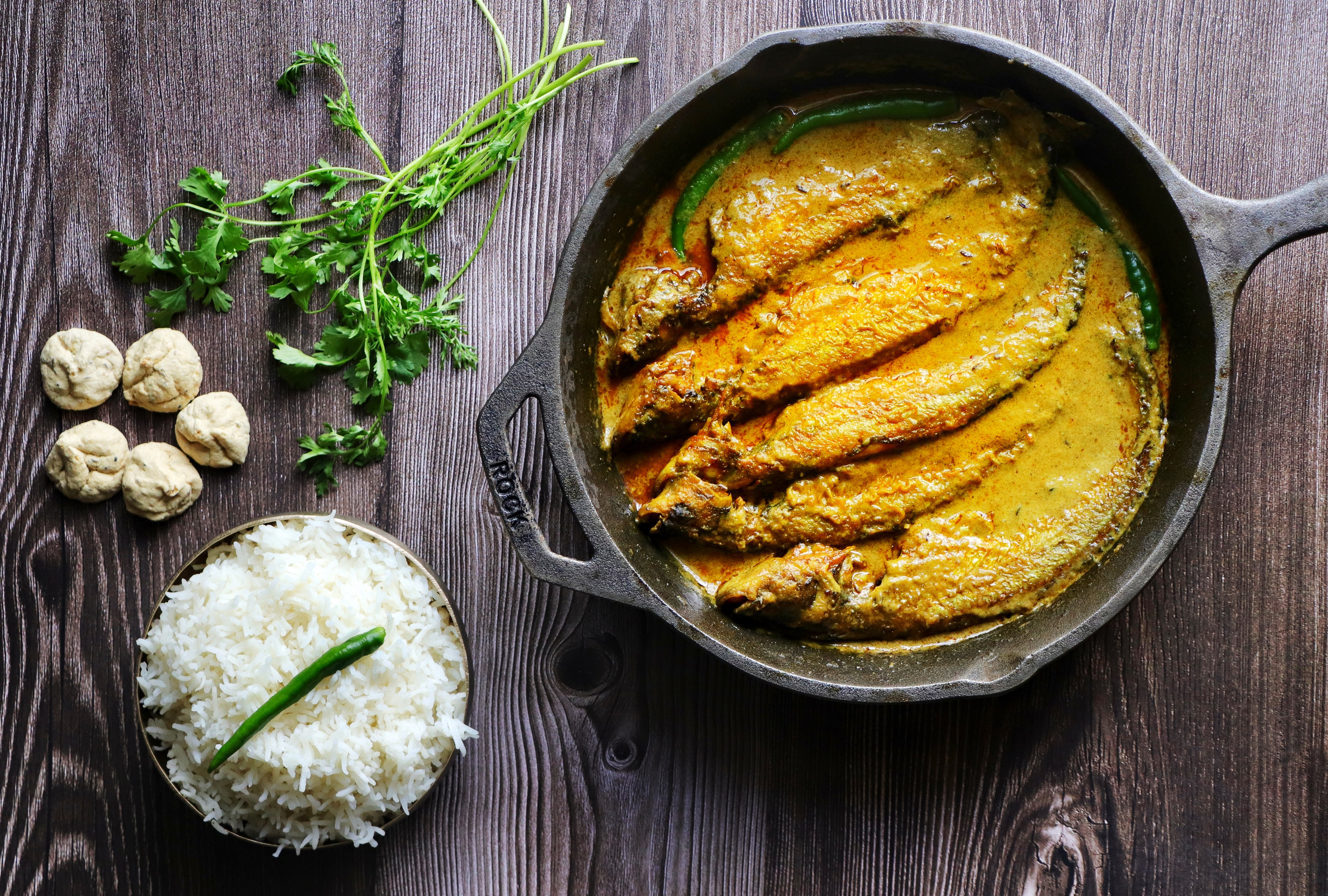
Machher jhol, a spicy fish curry eaten in eastern India, Nepal, and Bangladesh

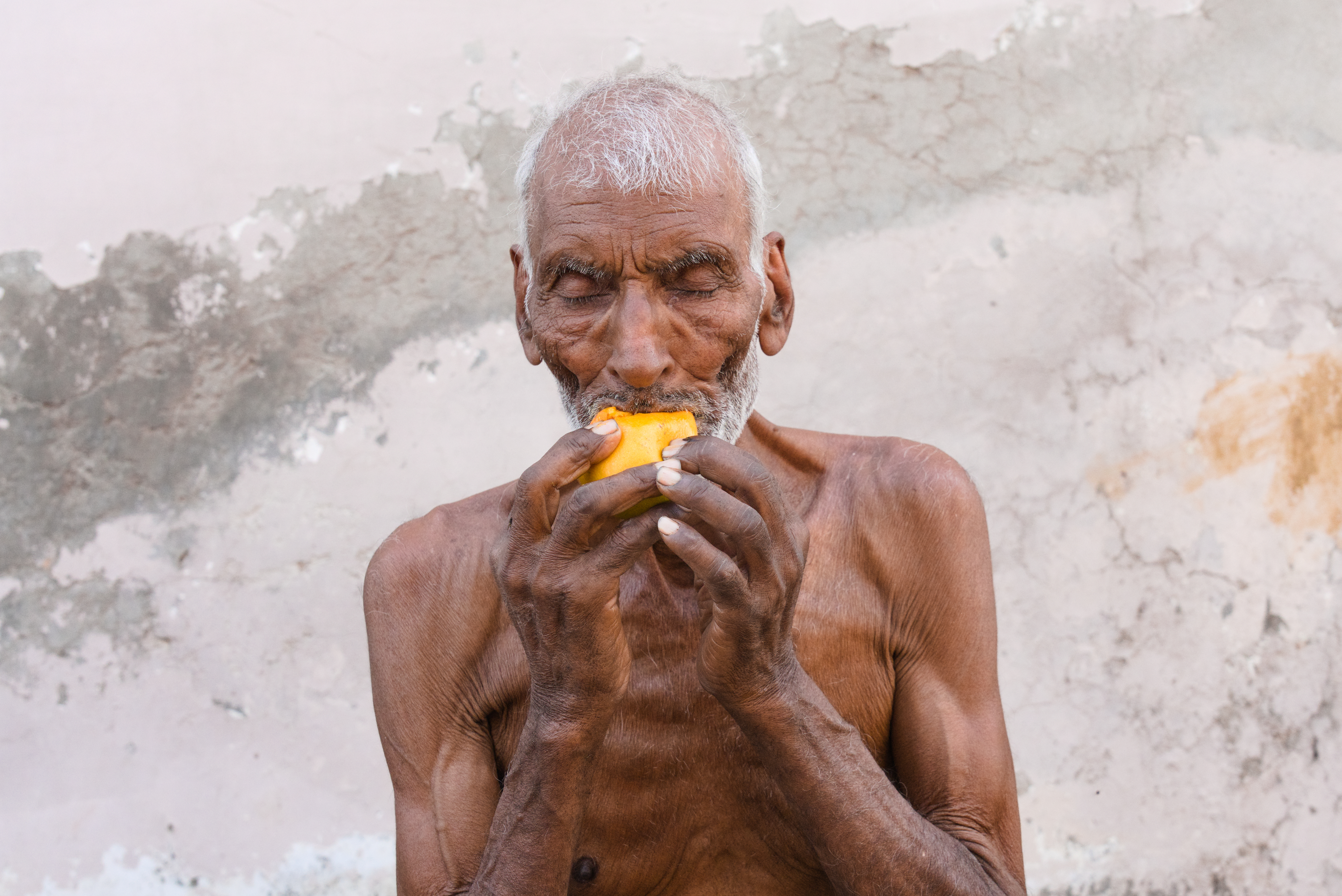
Mango, the national fruit of India, is eaten widely in the summer months. (Note: Genetic studies have shown that mangos were first domesticated in the region between northeastern India, northwestern Myanmar, and Bangladesh.)

=== Sports ===
Sport in modern India is a nexus of little-known indigenous traditions and commercial sporting events with worldwide reach. Traditional sports such as kabaddi and kho-kho have experienced a resurgence, attracting large television audiences; on the other hand, kushti wrestling in rural akharas—often regarded by its practitioners as not so much a sport as a physical and moral regimen—has continued to survive away from the exposure of broadcasting. Cricket is India's most watched sport and a multi-billion dollar industry. The widespread popularity of chess among youth in southern India culminated in 18-year-old Gukesh Dommaraju of Chennai winning the undisputed World Chess Champion title in 2024.

British intervention reshaped India's athletic landscape. It introduced cricket, football and field hockey and institutionalised polo—a sport whose history is a case of reverse migration from India to the West. Today, at the rural grassroots level, government initiatives like "Khelo India" have democratised athletics for traditionally overlooked youth. Rural soccer programs have employed teamwork to break down old caste barriers. State initiatives such as the Target Olympic Podium Scheme have expanded resources for female athletes; meanwhile, the prominent international victories of figures like boxer Mary Kom and badminton player P. V. Sindhu have challenged traditional gender stereotypes in sports.

India has won eight men's cricket ICC tournament titles: two Cricket World Cups, three T20 World Cups, and three Champions Trophy titles. India has won a record eight men's field hockey gold medals in the summer Olympics, the last in 1980.

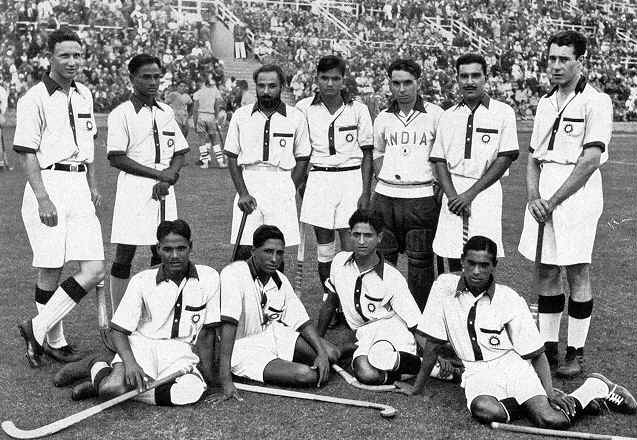
The Indian hockey team, captained by Dhyan Chand (standing second from l.), after winning the finals at the 1936 Summer Olympics – their third of six consecutive Olympic golds (Note: (Standing l. to r.: Earnest Goodsir-Cullen (centre half); Major Dhyan Chand (Captain and centre-forward); Syed Mohammad Jaffar (Vice-captain & Left Wing); Peter Paul Fernandes (Left Forward/Inside Left); Richard John Allen (Goalkeeper), standing dead centre; Baburao Narsoo Nimal (Centre Half); Carlyle Carroll Tapsell (Full-back)). (Sitting l. to r.: Joseph Philips (Inside Right); Roop Singh (Left Inside Forward); Mirza Nasir-ud-din Masud (Inside Forward); and Ali Iqtidar Shah Dara (Right Inside Forward)))

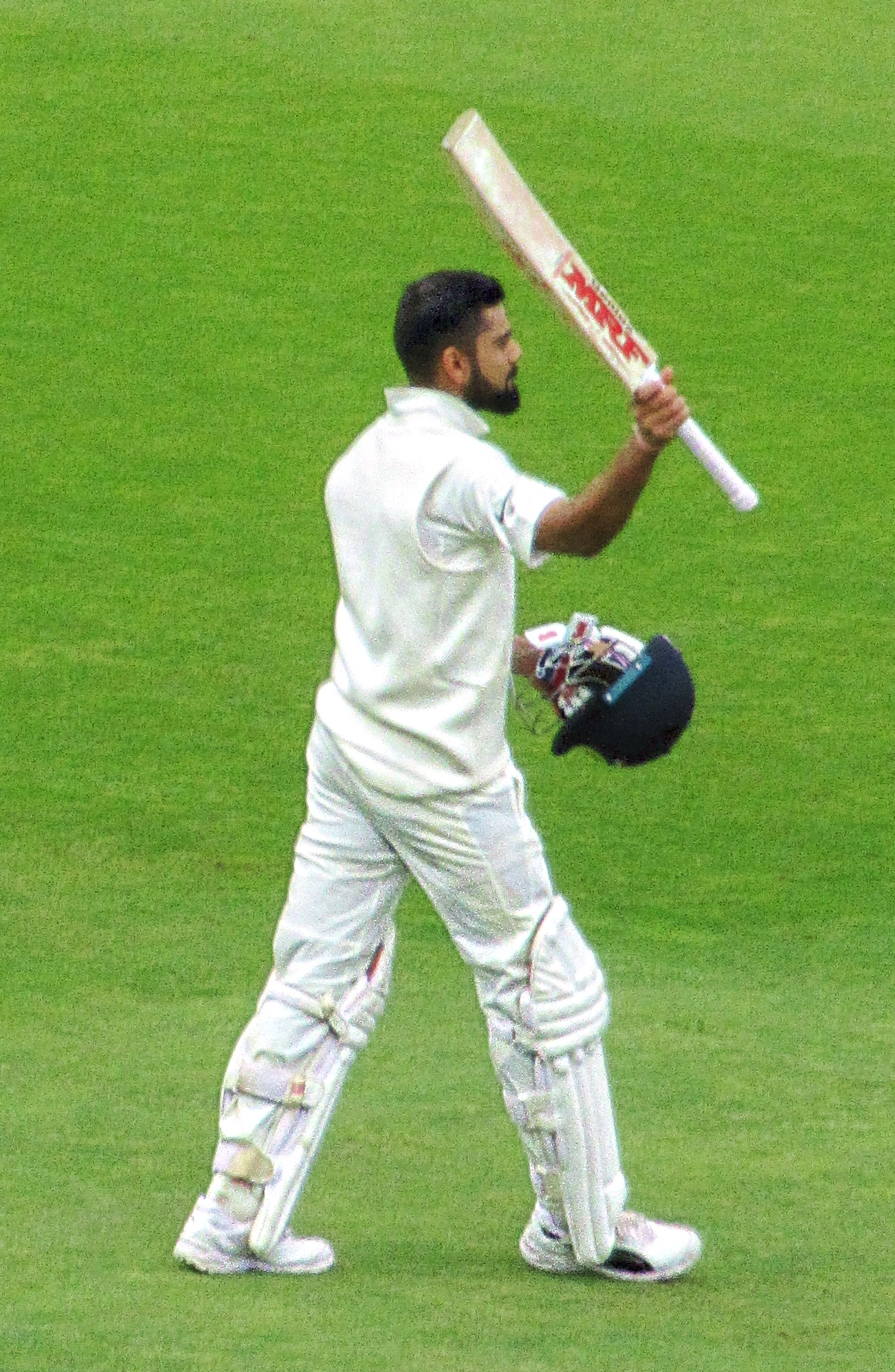
Indian batsman, Virat Kohli, after his century at Trent Bridge, 20 August 2018

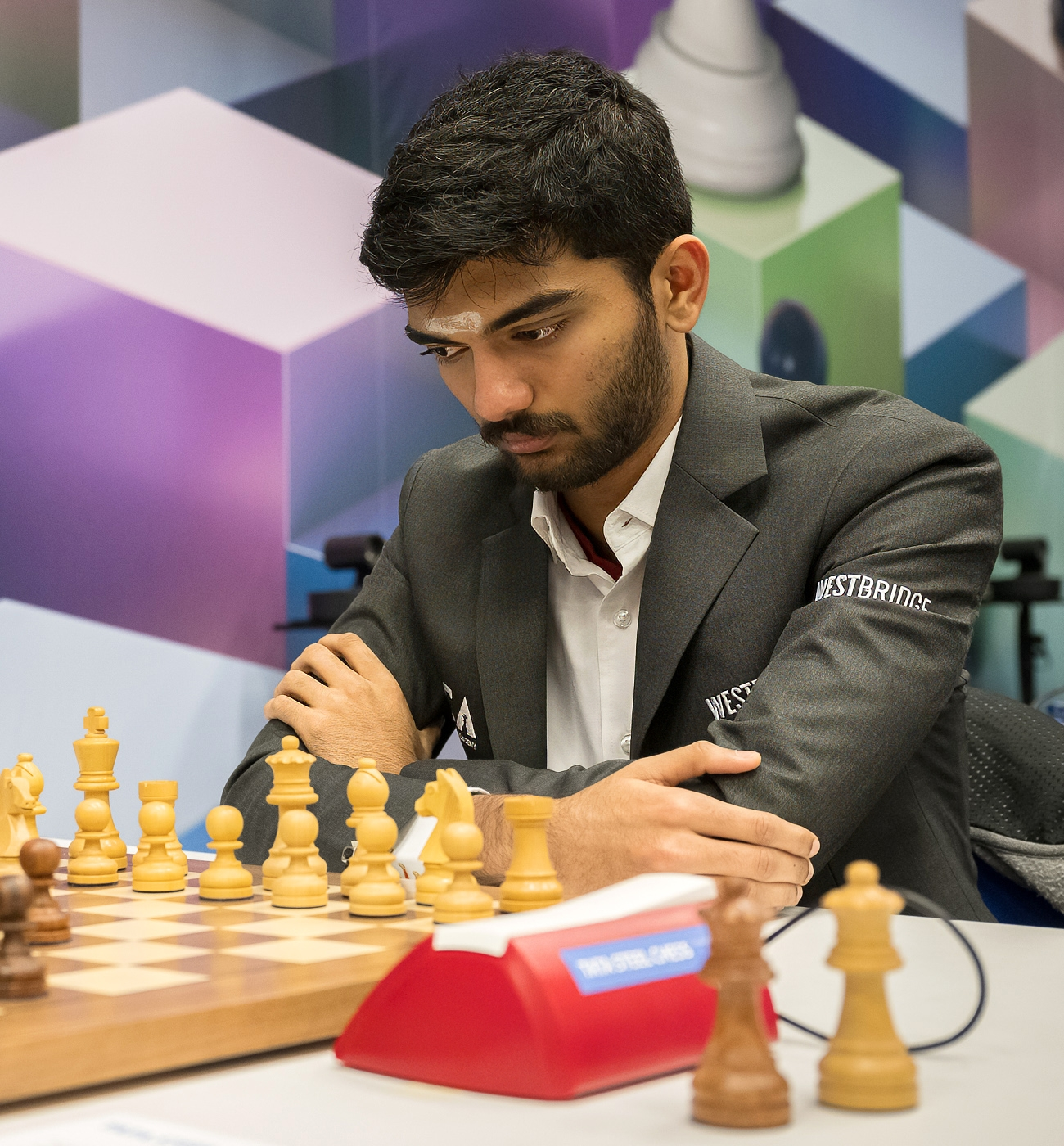
Gukesh Dommaraju from Chennai, the reigning world chess champion and the youngest ever

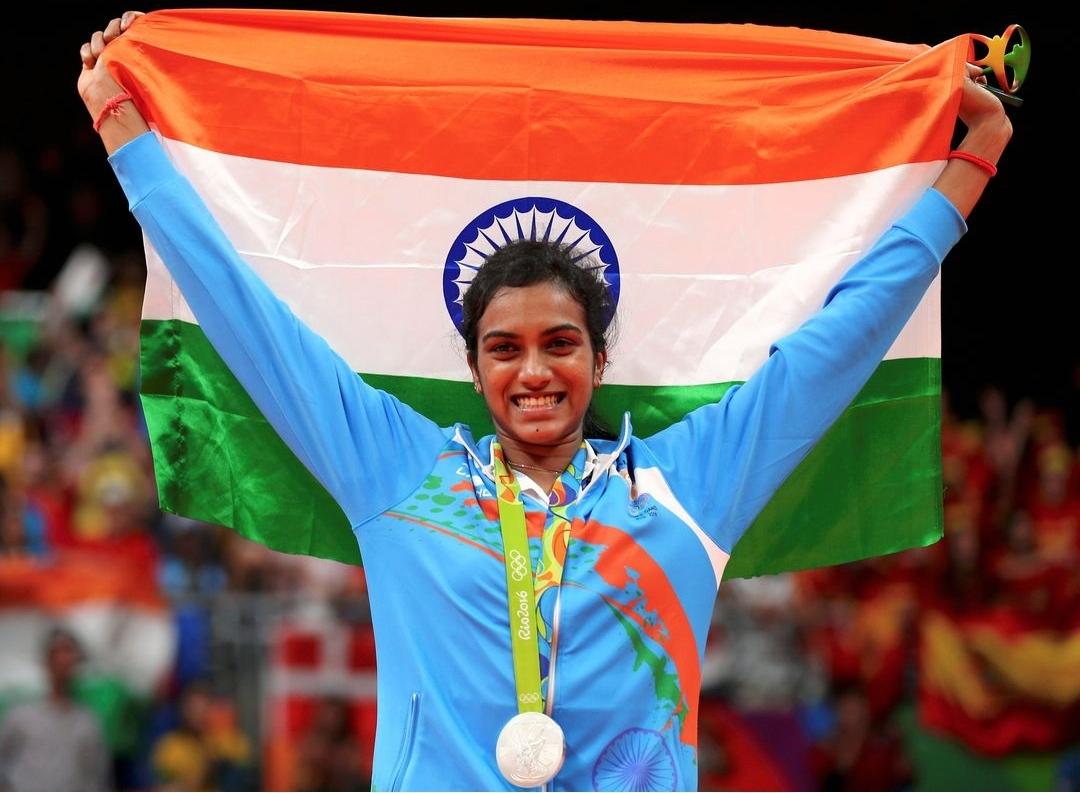
P. V. Sindhu, after winning the silver medal in Badminton at the Summer Olympics in Rio de Janeiro, August 2016

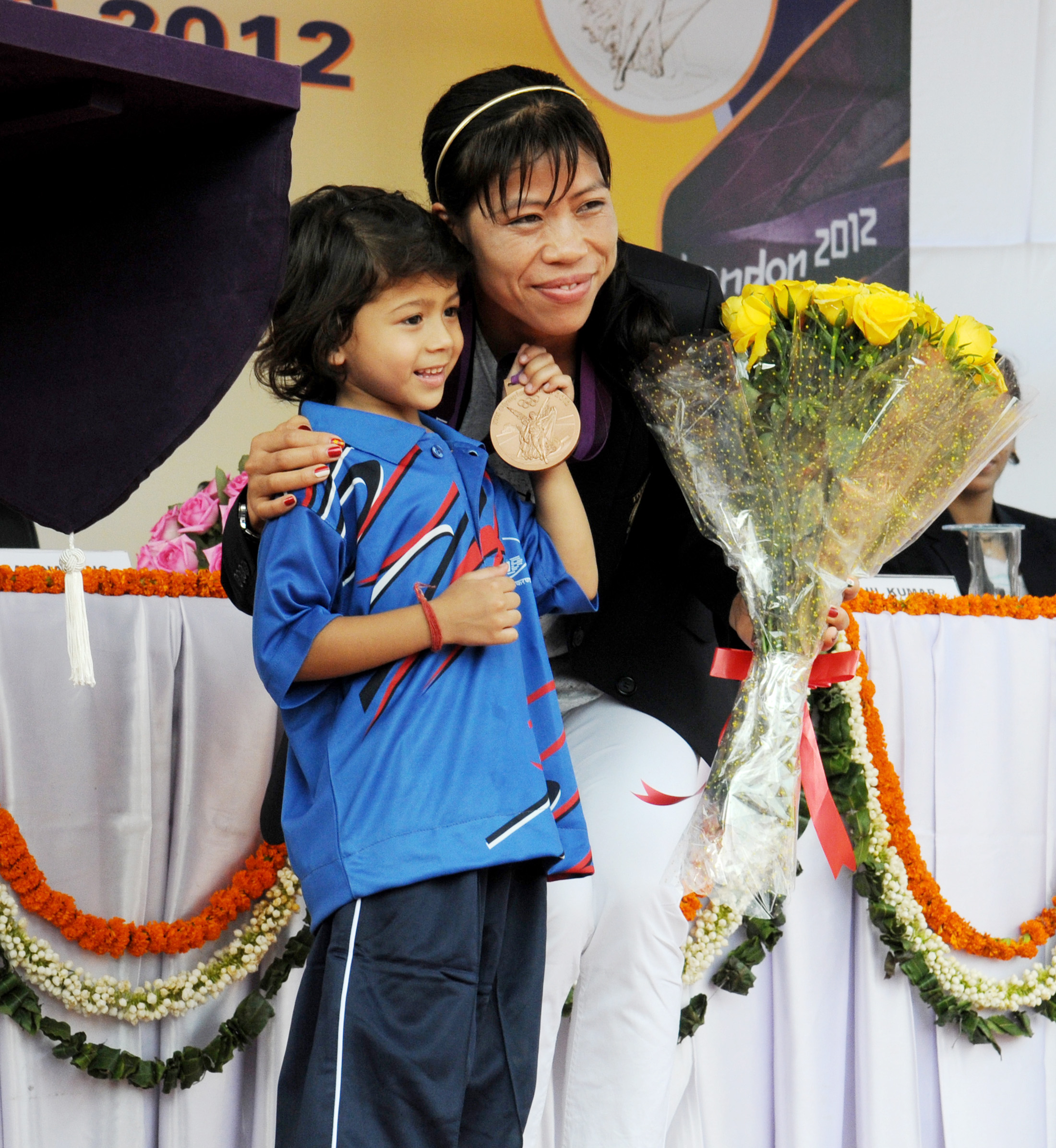
A young athlete after felicitating Mary Kom—a 2012 London Summer Olympics boxing medal winner—New Delhi, 16 August 2012

== See also ==
- Greater India
- Outline of India

== Bibliography ==
=== Overview ===
- "India". The World Factbook. Central Intelligence Agency. Archived from the original on 11 January 2021.
- "Country Profile: India" (PDF). Library of Congress Country Studies (5th ed.). Library of Congress Federal Research Division. December 2004. Archived from the original (PDF) on 27 September 2011.
- Provisional Population Totals Paper 1 of 2011 India. Office of the Registrar General and Census Commissioner. Archived from the original on 9 September 2021.
- Robinson, Francis, ed. The Cambridge Encyclopedia of India, Pakistan, Bangladesh, Sri Lanka, Nepal, Bhutan and the Maldives (1989)
- Constituent Assembly of India – Volume XII. National Informatics Centre, Government of India. 24 January 1950. Archived from the original on 21 July 2011.

=== Etymology ===
- Barrow, Ian J. (2003). "From Hindustan to India: Naming change in changing names". South Asia: Journal of South Asian Studies. 26 (1): 37–49. doi:10.1080/085640032000063977.
- Clémentin-Ojha, Catherine (2014). "'India, that is Bharat...': One Country, Two Names". South Asia Multidisciplinary Academic Journal. 10. doi:10.4000/samaj.3717.

=== History ===
- Asher, C. B.; Talbot, C. (2022). India Before Europe. Cambridge University Press. ISBN 978-1-108-42816-3.
- Brown, J. M. (1994). Modern India: The Origins of an Asian Democracy. The Short Oxford History of the Modern World (2nd ed.). Oxford University Press. ISBN 978-0-19-873113-9.
- Copland, I. (2001). India 1885–1947: The Unmaking of an Empire. Longman. ISBN 978-0-582-38173-5.
- Elverskog, Johan (2020). The Buddha's Footprint: An Environmental History of Asia. Philadelphia: University of Pennsylvania Press. ISBN 978-0-8122-5183-8.
- Gilbert, Marc Jason (2017). South Asia in World History. The New Oxford World History series. Oxford University Press. pp. 54–56. ISBN 978-0-19-517653-7.
- Jaffrelot, Christophe (2019). Modi's India: Hindu Nationalism and the Rise of Ethnic Democracy. Princeton University Press. ISBN 978-0-691-20680-6.
- Jamison, Stephanie W.; Brereton, Joel P. (2014). The Rigveda: The Earliest Religious Poetry of India. Vol. 1. New York: Oxford University Press. ISBN 978-0-19-517918-7.
- Kulke, H.; Rothermund, D. (2016). A History of India. 6th. Routledge. ISBN 978-1-138-96114-2.
- Lowe, John J. (2015). Participles in Rigvedic Sanskrit: The Syntax and Semantics of Adjectival Verb Forms. Oxford University Press. ISBN 978-0-19-100505-3.
- Ludden, D. (2014). India and South Asia: A Short History (2nd, revised ed.). Oneworld Publications. ISBN 978-1-85168-936-1.
- Marriott, John (2013). The other empire: Metropolis, India and progress in the colonial imagination. Manchester University Press. ISBN 978-1-84779-061-3.
- Metcalf, Barbara D.; Metcalf, Thomas R. (2006). A Concise History of Modern India (2nd ed.). Cambridge University Press. ISBN 978-0-521-68225-1.
- Metcalf, Barbara D.; Metcalf, Thomas R. (2012). A Concise History of Modern India. Cambridge University Press. ISBN 978-1-107-02649-0. Archived from the original on 13 July 2023.
- Peers, D. M. (2006). India under Colonial Rule: 1700–1885. Pearson Longman. ISBN 978-0-582-31738-3.
- Flood, Gavin (2020). "Introduction". In Gavin Flood (ed.). The Oxford History of Hinduism: Hindu Practice: Hindu Practice. Oxford University Press. ISBN 978-0-19-105322-1.
- Iori, Elisa (2023). "Releasing Urban Religion beyond the City Wall: The Spatial Capital of Early Buddhist Monasticism in NW South Asia". Numen. 70 (2–3): 184–219. doi:10.1163/15685276-20231691. hdl:10278/5079362.
- Jamison, Stephanie; Brereton, Joel (2020). The Rigveda. Oxford University Press. ISBN 978-0-19-063339-4.
- Mattern, Susan (2019). The Slow Moon Climbs: The Science, History, and Meaning of Menopause. Princeton, NJ, and London: Princeton University Press. ISBN 978-0-691-17163-0.
- Michaels, Axel (2017). Patrick Olivelle, Donald R. Davis (ed.). The Oxford History of Hinduism: Hindu Law: A New History of Dharmaśāstra. Oxford: Oxford University Press. ISBN 978-0-19-100709-5.
- Peers, D. M. (2013). India Under Colonial Rule: 1700–1885. Routledge. ISBN 978-1-317-88286-2.
- Petraglia, Michael D.; Allchin, Bridget (2007). "Human evolution and culture change in the Indian subcontinent". In Michael Petraglia; Bridget Allchin (eds.). The Evolution and History of Human Populations in South Asia: Inter-disciplinary Studies in Archaeology, Biological Anthropology, Linguistics and Genetics. Springer Publishing. ISBN 978-1-4020-5562-1.
- Ramusack, Barbara N. (1999). "Women in South Asia". In Barbara N. Ramusack; Sharon L. Sievers (eds.). Women in Asia: Restoring Women to History. Indiana University Press. ISBN 978-0-253-21267-2.
- Robb, P. (2011). A History of India. Palgrave Macmillan. ISBN 978-0-230-34549-2.
- Roy, Tirthankar (2012). India in the World Economy: From Antiquity to the Present. Cambridge and New York: Cambridge University Press. ISBN 978-1-107-00910-3.
- Singh, Upinder (2017). Political Violence in Ancient India. Harvard University Press. ISBN 978-0-674-98128-7.
- Spear, Percival (1990) [1978]. History of India, Volume 2: From the sixteenth century to the twentieth century. Penguin. ISBN 978-0-14-013836-8.
- Stein, B. (2010). Arnold, D. (ed.). A History of India (2nd ed.). Oxford: Wiley-Blackwell. ISBN 978-1-4051-9509-6.
- Talbot, Ian (2016). A History of Modern South Asia: Politics, States, and Diasporas. Yale University Press. ISBN 978-0-300-19694-8.
- Truschke, Audrey (2025). India: 5,000 Years of History on the Subcontinent. Princeton University Press. ISBN 978-0-691-22122-9.
- Van Brummelen, Glenn (2014). "Arithmetic". In Glick, Thomas F.; Livesey, Steven; Wallis, Faith (eds.). Medieval Science, Technology, and Medicine: An Encyclopedia. Routledge. ISBN 978-1-135-45932-1.
- Witzel, Michael (2003). "Vedas and Upanișads". In Gavin D. Flood (ed.). The Blackwell companion to Hinduism. John Wiley & Sons. ISBN 978-0-631-21535-6.
- Wolpert, S. (2003). A New History of India (7th ed.). Oxford University Press. ISBN 978-0-19-516678-1.
- Wright, Rita P. (2010). The Ancient Indus: Urbanism, Economy, and Society. Cambridge University Press. ISBN 978-0-521-57219-4.

=== Geography ===
- Ali, J. R.; Aitchison, J. C. (2005). "Greater India". Earth-Science Reviews. 72 (3–4): 170–173. Bibcode:2005ESRv...72..169A. doi:10.1016/j.earscirev.2005.07.005.
- Barry, Roger G.; Hall-McKim, Eileen A. (2018). Essentials of the Earth's Climate Systems. Cambridge University Press. ISBN 978-1-139-58390-9.
- Basu, Mahua; Xavier, Savarimuthu (2017). Fundamentals of Environmental Studies. Cambridge University Press. ISBN 978-1-316-87051-8.
- Forest (Conservation) Act, 1980 with Amendments Made in 1988 (PDF). Department of Environment and Forests, Government of the Andaman and Nicobar Islands. 1988. Archived from the original (PDF) on 21 July 2011.
- Dikshit, K. R.; Schwartzberg, Joseph E. (2023). "India: Land". Encyclopædia Britannica. pp. 1–29. Archived from the original on 8 May 2015.
- Duff, D. (1993). Holmes Principles of Physical Geology (4th ed.). Routledge. ISBN 978-0-7487-4381-0.
- Kaul, R. N. (1970). "The Indian Subcontinent: Indo-Pakistan". In Kaul, R. N. (ed.). Afforestation in Arid Zones. The Hague: Dr. W. Junk, N.V., Publishers. ISBN 978-94-010-3352-7.
- Kumar, V. Sanil; Pathak, K. C.; Pednekar, P.; Raju, N. S. N.; Gowthaman, R. (2006). "Coastal processes along the Indian coastline" (PDF). Current Science. 91 (4): 530–536. Archived from the original (PDF) on 8 September 2009.
- Mcgrail, Sean; Blue, Lucy; Kentley, Eric; Palmer, Colin (2003). Boats of South Asia. Routledge. ISBN 978-1-134-43130-4.
- Molnar, Peter (2015). Plate Tectonics: A Very Short Introduction. Oxford University Press. ISBN 978-0-19-872826-9.
- India Yearbook 2007. New Delhi: Publications Division, Ministry of Information and Broadcasting, Government of India. 2007. ISBN 978-81-230-1423-4.
- Prakash, B.; Kumar, S.; Rao, M. S.; Giri, S. C. (2000). "Holocene Tectonic Movements and Stress Field in the Western Gangetic Plains" (PDF). Current Science. 79 (4): 438–449. Archived (PDF) from the original on 4 May 2011.
- Prasad, Ishwar (1974). "The Ecology of Vertebrates of the Indian Desert". In Mani, M. S. (ed.). Ecology and Biogeography in India. The Hague: Dr. W. Junk bv Publishers. ISBN 978-94-010-2333-7.

Biodiversity:

- Basak, R. K. (1983). Botanical Survey of India: Account of Its Establishment, Development, and Activities. India. Department of Environment.
- Crame, J. A.; Owen, A. W. (2002). Palaeobiogeography and Biodiversity Change: The Ordovician and Mesozoic–Cenozoic Radiations. Geological Society Special Publication. Geological Society of London. ISBN 978-1-86239-106-2.
- Karanth, K. Ullas; Gopal, Rajesh (2005). "An ecology-based policy framework for human-tiger coexistence in India". In Rosie Woodroffe; Simon Thirgood; Alan Rabinowitz (eds.). People and Wildlife, Conflict Or Co-existence?. Cambridge University Press. ISBN 978-0-521-53203-7.
- Karanth, K. P. (2006). "Out-of-India Gondwanan Origin of Some Tropical Asian Biota" (PDF). Current Science. 90 (6): 789–792. Archived from the original (PDF) on 11 April 2019.
- Tritsch, M. F. (2001). Wildlife of India. London: HarperCollins. ISBN 978-0-00-711062-9.
- Indian Wildlife (Protection) Act, 1972. Ministry of Environment and Forests, Government of India. 9 September 1972. Archived from the original on 16 July 2011.

=== Politics ===
- Bora, Banasmita (2024). "9. The Election Commission of India and Its Evolution". In Ganguly, Sumit; Sridharan, Eswaran (eds.). The Oxford Handbook of Indian Politics. Oxford University Press. pp. 127–142. ISBN 978-0-19-889426-1.
- Bunce, Valerie I.; Pepinsky, Thomas B.; Riedl, Rachel Beatty; Roberts, Kenneth M. (2025). "Introduction". In Bunce, Valerie I.; Pepinsky, Thomas B.; Riedl, Rachel Beatty; Roberts, Kenneth M (eds.). Global Challenges to Democracy: Comparative Perspectives on Backsliding, Autocracy, and Resilience. Cambridge University Press. pp. 1–6. ISBN 978-1-009-60260-0.
- Beissinger, Mark (2025). "Civil Society Resistance to Democratic Backsliding". In Bunce, Valerie I.; Pepinsky, Thomas B.; Riedl, Rachel Beatty; Roberts, Kenneth M (eds.). Global Challenges to Democracy: Comparative Perspectives on Backsliding, Autocracy, and Resilience. Cambridge University Press. pp. 196–214. ISBN 978-1-009-60260-0.
- Farooqui, Adnan (2024). "25. Muslim Representation". In Ganguly, Sumit; Sridharan, Eswaran (eds.). The Oxford Handbook of Indian Politics. Oxford University Press. pp. 427–444. ISBN 978-0-19-889426-1.
- Jaffrelot, Christophe (2024). "12 The BJP's Ideology, Structures, Sociology, and Strategies". In Ganguly, Sumit; Sridharan, Eswaran (eds.). The Oxford Handbook of Indian Politics. Oxford University Press. pp. 179–194. ISBN 978-0-19-889426-1.
- Jayal, Niraja Gopal (2024). "1. Rights and Citizenship". In Ganguly, Sumit; Sridharan, Eswaran (eds.). The Oxford Handbook of Indian Politics. Oxford University Press. pp. 3–16. ISBN 978-0-19-889426-1.
- Hasan, Zoya (2024). "13. The Congress Party in Decline". In Ganguly, Sumit; Sridharan, Eswaran (eds.). The Oxford Handbook of Indian Politics. Oxford University Press. pp. 195–210. ISBN 978-0-19-889426-1.
- Madhavan, M. R. (2024). "2. The Lok Sabha". In Ganguly, Sumit; Sridharan, Eswaran (eds.). The Oxford Handbook of Indian Politics. Oxford University Press. pp. 17–30. ISBN 978-0-19-889426-1.
- Mathew, George (2024). "8 Politics in the Third Tier: Municipalities and Panchayats". In Ganguly, Sumit; Sridharan, Eswaran (eds.). The Oxford Handbook of Indian Politics. Oxford University Press. pp. 111–124. ISBN 978-0-19-889426-1.
- Mehra, Ajay K. (2024). "4 The Indian Cabinet". In Ganguly, Sumit; Sridharan, Eswaran (eds.). The Oxford Handbook of Indian Politics. Oxford University Press. pp. 47–64. ISBN 978-0-19-889426-1.
- "National Symbols". Know India. National Informatics Centre, Government of India. Archived from the original on 18 April 2021.
- Palshikar, Suhas (2024). "18. Caste and Politics: Limits of Democratization". In Ganguly, Sumit; Sridharan, Eswaran (eds.). The Oxford Handbook of Indian Politics. Oxford University Press. pp. 291–304. ISBN 978-0-19-889426-1.
- Saxena, Adnan (2024). "6 The Changing Nature of Federalism in India". In Ganguly, Sumit; Sridharan, Eswaran (eds.). The Oxford Handbook of Indian Politics. Oxford University Press. pp. 81–96. ISBN 978-0-19-889426-1.
- Sen, Ronojoy (2024). "5 The Supreme Court". In Ganguly, Sumit; Sridharan, Eswaran (eds.). The Oxford Handbook of Indian Politics. Oxford University Press. pp. 65–78. ISBN 978-0-19-889426-1.
- Sharma, B. K. (2007). Introduction to the Constitution of India (4th ed.). Prentice Hall. ISBN 978-81-203-3246-1.
- Shastri, Sandeep (2024). "3 The Rajya Sabha: A 'Federal Chamber' or a Mere Upper House in the Indian Parliament?". In Ganguly, Sumit; Sridharan, Eswaran (eds.). The Oxford Handbook of Indian Politics. Oxford University Press. pp. 31–46. ISBN 978-0-19-889426-1.
- Spary, Carole (2024). "19. Women in Indian Politics". In Ganguly, Sumit; Sridharan, Eswaran (eds.). The Oxford Handbook of Indian Politics. Oxford University Press. pp. 305–326. ISBN 978-0-19-889426-1.
- Staniland, Paul (2024). "29. Insurgencies and Political Violence in India". In Ganguly, Sumit; Sridharan, Eswaran (eds.). The Oxford Handbook of Indian Politics. Oxford University Press. pp. 497–512. ISBN 978-0-19-889426-1.
- Verma, Arvind (2024). "30. Coercive Instruments of the State". In Ganguly, Sumit; Sridharan, Eswaran (eds.). The Oxford Handbook of Indian Politics. Oxford University Press. pp. 513–524. ISBN 978-0-19-889426-1.
- Ziegfeld, Adam (2024). "14. Regional Parties". In Ganguly, Sumit; Sridharan, Eswaran (eds.). The Oxford Handbook of Indian Politics. Oxford University Press. pp. 211–224. ISBN 978-0-19-889426-1.

Foreign relations and military:

- Ganguly, Sumit (2024). "31. The Evolution of India's Foreign Policy". In Ganguly, Sumit; Sridharan, Eswaran (eds.). The Oxford Handbook of Indian Politics. Oxford University Press. pp. 527–544. ISBN 978-0-19-889426-1.
- Kampani, Gaurav (2024). "35. The New Normal: India's Quest for the 'Credible' in Nuclear Deterrence". In Ganguly, Sumit; Sridharan, Eswaran (eds.). The Oxford Handbook of Indian Politics. Oxford University Press. pp. 593–614. ISBN 978-0-19-889426-1.
- Tarapore, Arzan (2024). "32. The Functions and Challenges of Indian Defence Policy". In Ganguly, Sumit; Sridharan, Eswaran (eds.). The Oxford Handbook of Indian Politics. Oxford University Press. pp. 545–556. ISBN 978-0-19-889426-1.

=== Economy ===
- Gupta, Bishnupriya (2025). An Economic History of India: Growth, Income and Inequalities from the Mughals to the 21st Century. Cambridge Studies in Economic History - Second Series. Cambridge University Press. doi:10.1017/9781108869065. ISBN 978-1-108-86906-5.
- Chaudhary, Latika; Roy, Thrthankar; Swamy, Anand V. (2026). "Introduction". In Chaudhary, Latika; Roy, Tirthankar; Swamy, Anand V. (eds.). Cambridge Economic History of Modern South Asia, part 2: South Asia, 1947–Present. Cambridge University Press. pp. 1–10. ISBN 978-1-009-76948-8.
- Roy, Tirthankar (2020). The Economic History of India 1857–2010 (4th ed.). Oxford University Press. ISBN 978-0-19-012829-6.
- Tomlinson, B. R. (2013). The Economy of Modern India: From 1860 to the Twenty-First Century (2nd ed.). Cambridge University Press. ISBN 978-0-19-012829-6.

=== Demographics ===
- Chandramouli, C. (15 July 2011). Rural Urban Distribution of Population (PDF). Ministry of Home Affairs (India). Archived (PDF) from the original on 18 March 2015.
- Dyson, T.; Visaria, P. (2005). "Migration and Urbanisation: Retrospect and Prospects". In Dyson, T.; Casses, R.; Visaria, L. (eds.). Twenty-First Century India: Population, Economy, Human Development, and the Environment. Oxford University Press. ISBN 978-0-19-928382-8.
- Dyson, Tim (2018). A Population History of India: From the First Modern People to the Present Day. Oxford University Press. ISBN 978-0-19-882905-8. Archived from the original on 25 September 2024.
- Fisher, Michael H. (2018). An Environmental History of India: From Earliest Times to the Twenty-First Century. Cambridge and New York: Cambridge University Press. doi:10.1017/9781316276044. ISBN 978-1-107-11162-2. LCCN 2018021693. Archived from the original on 25 September 2024.
- Garg, S. C. (19 April 2005). Mobilizing Urban Infrastructure Finance in India (PDF). World Bank. Archived from the original (PDF) on 24 August 2009.
- Ratna, U. (2007). "Interface Between Urban and Rural Development in India". In Dutt, A. K.; Thakur, B. (eds.). City, Society, and Planning. Vol. 1. Concept. ISBN 978-81-8069-459-2.
- Rorabacher, J. A. (2010). Hunger and Poverty in South Asia. Gyan. ISBN 978-81-212-1027-0.
- Notification No. 2/8/60-O.L. Ministry of Home Affairs, Government of India. 27 April 1960. Archived from the original on 1 October 2014.
- "Census Data 2001". Office of the Registrar General and Census Commissioner. Ministry of Home Affairs, Government of India. 2010–2011. Archived from the original on 12 August 2011.

=== Culture ===
- Asher, Catherine B. (1992). Architecture of Mughal India. New Cambridge History of India series. Cambridge; New York: Cambridge University Press. doi:10.1017/CHOL9780521267281. ISBN 978-0-521-26728-1.
- Béteille, André (2002). "Caste". In Barnard, Alan; Spencer, Jonathan (eds.). Encyclopedia of Social and Cultural Anthropology. New York; London: Routledge. ISBN 978-0-415-28558-2.
- Blurton, T. Richard (1993). Hindu Art. Harvard University Press. ISBN 978-0-674-39189-5.
- Bourbaki, Nicolas (1998). Elements of the History of Mathematics. Berlin, Heidelberg, and New York: Springer-Verlag, 301 pages. ISBN 978-3-540-64767-6.
- Craven, Roy C (1997). Indian art: a concise history. New York City: Thames & Hudson. ISBN 978-0-500-20302-6. OCLC 37895110.
- Cullen-Dupont, K. (July 2009). Human Trafficking. Infobase Publishing. ISBN 978-0-8160-7545-4.
- Filliozat, Pierre-Sylvain (2004). "Ancient Sanskrit Mathematics: An Oral Tradition and a Written Literature". In Chemla, Karine; Cohen, Robert S.; Renn, Jürgen; et al. (eds.). History of Science, History of Text (Boston Series in the Philosophy of Science). Dordrecht: Springer Netherlands, 254 pages, pp. 137–157. pp. 360–375. doi:10.1007/1-4020-2321-9_7. ISBN 978-1-4020-2320-0..
- Gupta, Dipankar (2008). "Caste". In Schaefer, Richard T. (ed.). Encyclopedia of Race, Ethnicity, and Society. Thousand Oaks: SAGE. pp. 246–250. ISBN 978-1-4129-2694-2.
- Harle, James C. (1994). The Art and Architecture of the Indian Subcontinent. Yale University Press. ISBN 978-0-300-06217-5.
- Hayashi, Takao (2005). "Indian Mathematics". In Flood, Gavin (ed.). The Blackwell Companion to Hinduism. Oxford: Basil Blackwell, 616 pages, pp. 360–375. pp. 360–375. ISBN 978-1-4051-3251-0..
- Hayashi, Takao (1995). The Bakhshali Manuscript, An ancient Indian mathematical treatise. Groningen: Egbert Forsten, 596 pages. ISBN 978-90-6980-087-5..
- Ifrah, Georges (2000). A Universal History of Numbers: From Prehistory to Computers. New York: Wiley. ISBN 978-0-471-39340-5.
- Jones, G.; Ramdas, K. (2005). (Un)tying the Knot: Ideal and Reality in Asian Marriage. National University of Singapore Press. ISBN 978-981-05-1428-0.
- Kiple, K. F.; Ornelas, K. C., eds. (2000). The Cambridge World History of Food. Vol. 2. Cambridge and New York: Cambridge University Press. ISBN 978-0-521-40215-6.
- Kramer, Stephanie (2021a). Religious Composition of India (Report). Pew Research Center.
- Kramer, Stephanie (2021b). Population Growth and Religious Composition (Report). Pew Research Center.
- Kramer, Stephanie (2021c). Religious demography of Indian states and territories (Report). Pew Research Center.
- Kuiper, K., ed. (2010). The Culture of India. Britannica Educational Publishing. ISBN 978-1-61530-203-1.
- Lagasse, Paul (2007). "Caste". In Lagasse, Paul (ed.). The Columbia Encyclopedia. New York, NY: Columbia University Press. ISBN 978-0-231-14446-9. Archived from the original on 1 October 2023.
- Lindenfeld, David (2021). World Christianity and Indigenous Experience: A Global History 1500–2000. Cambridge University Press. ISBN 978-1-108-91764-3.
- Madan, T. N. (2012). caste. Encyclopædia Britannica Online. Archived from the original on 30 January 2013.
- Makar, E. M. (2007). An American's Guide to Doing Business in India. Adams. ISBN 978-1-59869-211-2.
- Medora, N. (2003). "Mate Selection in Contemporary India: Love Marriages Versus Arranged Marriages". In Hamon, R. R.; Ingoldsby, B. B. (eds.). Mate Selection Across Cultures. SAGE Publications. pp. 209–230. ISBN 978-0-7619-2592-7.
- Michell, George (2000). Hindu Art and Architecture. Thames & Hudson. ISBN 978-0-500-20337-8.
- Mitchell, Geoffrey Duncan (2006). "Castes (part of SOCIAL STRATIFICATION)". A New Dictionary of the Social Sciences. New Brunswick, NJ: Aldine Transaction Publishers. pp. 194–195. ISBN 978-0-202-30878-4.
- Naim, C.M. (1978). "South Asian Literatures: Islamic". Encyclopaedia Britannica.
- Pingree, David (2003). "The logic of non-Western science: mathematical discoveries in medieval India". Daedalus. 132 (4): 45–54. doi:10.1162/001152603771338779..
- Plofker, K. (2007). "Mathematics of India". In Katz, Victor J. (ed.). The Mathematics of Egypt, Mesopotamia, China, India, and Islam: A Sourcebook. Princeton, NJ: Princeton University Press. pp. 385–514. ISBN 978-0-691-11485-9..
- Plofker, Kim (2009). Mathematics in India: 500 BCE–1800 CE. Princeton, NJ: Princeton University Press. ISBN 978-0-691-12067-6..
- Raghavendra, M. K. (2026). "The geopolitics of Kannada language cinema". In Gehlawat, Ajay; Beaster-Jones, Jayson (eds.). Routledge Handbook of South Asian Cinemas. Routledge. pp. 87–99. doi:10.4324/9781003497912-11. ISBN 978-1-032-80366-1.
- Roger, Delphine. "The Middle East and South Asia (in Chapter: History and Culture of Food and Drink in Asia)". In Kiple & Ornelas (2000), pp. 1140–1150.
- Rowland, Benjamin (1970). The Art and Architecture of India: Buddhist, Hindu, Jain. Penguin Books. ISBN 978-0-14-056102-9.
- Stillwell, John (2004). Mathematics and its History. Undergraduate Texts in Mathematics (2 ed.). Springer, Berlin and New York, 568 pages. doi:10.1007/978-1-4684-9281-1. ISBN 978-0-387-95336-6..
- Tarlo, E. (1996). Clothing Matters: Dress and Identity in India. University of Chicago Press. ISBN 978-0-226-78976-7.
