= Flandria Generosa =

The Flandria Generosa, originally (until 1643) known by the name Genealogia comitum Flandriae ("Genealogy of Flanders' Counts"), is a manuscript tradition of chronicle on the history of the County of Flanders. The first manuscript, now known as Flandria Generosa A, contains a genealogy of the Counts of Flanders from 792 to 1164, plus some historical notes in Latin. It was probably compiled shortly after 1164 by an unknown monk at the Abbey of Saint Bertin in the Flemish town of Saint-Omer (now in the Pas-de-Calais department of France). The name Flandria Generosa was given to it in 1643 by Georges Galopin, a monk of Saint-Ghislain Abbey (Hainaut Province), who was the first to publish this manuscript in print. This Flandria Generosa A was used for centuries afterwards by historiographers as a basic text for chronicling the county of Flanders.

Most surviving manuscripts in Middle Dutch are prose texts of the type Flandria Generosa C, and are also known as the Excellente Cronike van Vlaenderen ("Excellent Chronicle of Flanders"). The term Flandria Generosa B covers a group of manuscripts largely written in Old French, including the Chronique de Flandre, but also the Middle Dutch Rhymed Chronicle of Flanders (Rijmkroniek van Vlaanderen), preserved in the Comburg Manuscript, is a text of this type Flandria Generosa B.

== Textual tradition ==
The name Flandria Generosa comes from the title which Galopin (and later Paquot) gave to his printed edition of the Continuatio Gislenensis in 1643. Since then, the name Flandria Generosa has become established for the entire textual tradition, even though this phrase cannot be found in any medieval manuscript. Veronique Lambert (1988) summarised the situation as follows: "Several versions of Flandria Generosa can be distinguished. Flandria Generosa A refers to the Genealogia comitum Flandriae from 792 to 1164, as well as its various sequels. Flandria Generosa B takes the A version as its basis and compiles it with other sources. Flandria Generosa C takes the Continuatio Claromariscensis as its basis and expands it with numerous other sources.' A general, simplified stemma codicum looks as follows:

Genealogia Arnulfi comitis Flandriae (until 960)
De Arnulfo Comite (until 1067)
Genealogia Bertiniana (until 1111); Saint Peter's Abbey, Ghent? | Genealogia comitum Flandriae (until 1119) in the Liber Floridus; Lambert of Saint-Omer | "Flandria Generosa A"; Genealogia comitum Flandriae (until 1164); Abbey of Saint Bertin
Continuatio Gislenensis (until 1206); Saint-Ghislain Abbey | "Flandria Generosa B" compilation until 1164 (c. 1200) | Continuatio Claromariscensis (until 1214); Abbey of Clairmarais
Flandria Generosa, seu... (Georges Galopin 1643) textual tradition's namesake | Li générations... des contes de Flandres translation c. 1225–1250 | "Flandria Generosa C"; Catalogus et chronica... Flandriae until 1411/23; Bruges
other A manuscripts, mostly in Latin | other B manuscripts, mostly in Old French | other C manuscripts, mostly in Middle Dutch

Flandria Generosa A
Flandria Generosa B
Flandria Generosa C

== Flandria Generosa A ==
The Flandria Generosa A is the first document on the history of Flanders that provides significantly more than just genealogical information, although it builds on older genealogies from the 10th, 11th and early 12th centuries. The earliest known predecessor was the manuscript Genealogia Arnulfi comitis Flandriae (or Genealogiae Arnulfi comitis Flandrensis; 10th century, which covers the years c. 862–960). This was supplemented in the 11th century in Saint Peter's Abbey, Ghent under the title De Arnulfo Comite. This was subsequently supplemented in the 12th century to include Count Robert II and is known as the Genealogia Bertiniana, which Lambert of Saint-Omer in turn expanded under the name of Genealogia comitum Flandrensium (or Genealogia comitum Flandriae). An anonymous monk from St Bertin's Abbey wrote a genealogy under the same title in 1164, which for the first time also included a great deal of historical, non-genealogical information. It is this anonymous Saint Bertin chronicle from 1164 that was published by Galopin in 1643 under the title Flandria Generosa, which gave this literary tradition its name.

The genealogy of Flandria generosa A begins in 792 with the narrative of "Liederik (Lydéric) of Harelbeke" (a fictional character in the forestier legend) and ends in the year 1164. Manuscript 746 of the Bibliothèque Municipale of Saint-Omer was long considered the "autograph" of Flandria Generosa A, but Lambert (1988) doubted that, since the writer was clearly copying someone else's text (and making numerous careless mistakes in the process) instead of writing a new text himself. It consists mainly of information about the counts of Flanders. The name of the manuscript is sometimes given as Flandria Generosa A, as later writers not only frequently copied the genealogy, but also supplemented it, partly from other sources, up until the 16th century. Manuscript Brussels KBR 21887 is probably a direct copy of Saint-Omer 746, since all marginalia of 746 were included in the running text of 21887. On the other hand, the copyist wrote a very different text about the various husbands of Laurentia or Laureta of Flanders, and made several mistakes when writing out Latin dates in full.

== Flandria Generosa B ==
Flandria Generosa B

Walter of Thérouanne | Flandria Generosa A autograph (lost) c.1164 St-Bertin | Lambert of Saint- Omer
Herman of Tournai | Sigebert of Gembloux | St-Omer BM 746 copy autograph c.1164/8 St-Bertin | Tomelli hist. mon. Hasnon. | Andrew of Marchiennes
Tournai SB 135 abridged A/B? (lost 1940) | Flandria Generosa B compilation until 1164 c.1200; lost | Continuatio; Claromariscensis until 1214
(abridged Flandria; Generosa B c. 1210; lost) | Brussels KBR 6410 until 1164 copy 15th cent. | Continuatio; Claromariscensis until 1329
Li générations... contes de Flandres; Paris BnF fr. 12203 translated c. 1225 | Li générations... comtes de Flandres; Brussels KBR 9568 translated c. 1350
Chronique de Flandre until 1128; other sources until 1342 c. 1350 St-Omer | Rhymed Chronicle of Flanders until 1329; other sources until 1404; c. 1410 Ghent | Flandria Generosa C Catalogus et chronica... comitum Flandriae until 1411/23; Bruges

Flandria Generosa A
Flandria Generosa A + Continuatio Claromariscensis
Flandria Generosa B
Flandria Generosa B + other (Old French) sources until 14th century
Flandria Generosa B + Continuatio Claromariscensis + other sources until 15th century
Flandria Generosa C

=== Chronica Flandriae (manuscript KBR 6410) ===
Around the year 1200, the manuscript Brussels KBR 6410 was produced, entitled Chronica Flandriae, which for proper distinction is called Flandria Generosa B. This is the only known Latin manuscript of Flandria Generosa B that has been preserved. (Note: The codex Tournai SB 135 may also have contained a chronicle of type B or type A, but this was lost on 17 May 1940 during the bombing of Tournai. In 1938, researcher P. Faider had noted an incipit and a desinit, but they no longer permit to say with certainty which textual tradition the manuscript belonged to.) The writer took Flandria Generosa A as base text, and added a lot of information to it – in particular about the assassination of Flemish count Charles the Good and the resulting war of the Flemish succession (1127–1128, between Thierry of Alsace, William Clito, and Baldwin IV of Hainaut) – from other sources, almost all of which are known. (Note: Veronique Lambert (1988) identified the works of Walter of Thérouanne, Herman of Tournai, Sigebert of Gembloux, Lambert of Saint-Omer, the Tomelli historia monasterii Hasnoniensis and Andrew of Marchiennes as supplementary sources of manuscript Brussels KBR 6410.) The precise dating of manuscript KBR 6410 is disputed; according to Ludwig Bethmann (1849) it must have been written before 1193, because Andrew of Marchiennes supposedly used text from this manuscript for his chronicle. Veronique Lambert (1988) countered that it could just as easily be the other way around: that the compiler of manuscript KBR 6410 had used Andreas' chronicle as a source, and therefore wrote later than him. The only thing that is certain, is that in the first half of the 13th century, or in the middle of the 13th century, the Old French chronicle tradition developed from the B text of KBR 6410, known under the name Ancienne Chronique de Flandre ("Old Chronicle of Flanders"). This branch of Flandria Generosa B evolved in several directions until the 15th century, and also influenced other Middle Dutch writings, included the Rhymed Chronicle of Flanders in the Comburg Manuscript.

=== Li générations, li parole et li lignie de le lignie des contes de Flandres ===
Circa 1225–1250, a chronicle was composed in Old French, entitled Li générations, li parole et li lignie de le lignie des contes de Flandres (or comtes according to manuscript Brussels KBR 9568), meaning "The generations, the words and the lineage of the line of the counts of Flanders". It is also called the Ancienne Chronique de Flandre, not to be confused with the later Chronique de Flandre of circa 1350. There are four known manuscripts of this chronicle: Paris BN fr. 12203 (first half 13th century), Brussels KBR 9568 (mid-14th century), The Hague KB 71D5 (18th century, a copy of KBR 9568) and Ghent UB G 6077 (19th century, a copy of BN fr. 12203). Lambert (1988) demonstrated that the Parisian and Brussels manuscripts were two independently created translations from a lost manuscript that must have contained an abridgement of the Latin text of manuscript KBR 6410, because they omitted exactly the same pieces of text, and translated the rest in completely different Old French phrasings.

=== Chronique de Flandre ===
The first part of the 14th-century Chronique de Flandre, covering the years 792 to 1128, is an abridged version of Li générations, li parole et li lignie de le lignie des contes de Flandres. For the years 1128 to 1342, as well as in later continuations, entirely different sources are used that are unrelated to the Flandria Generosa B textual tradition. Therefore, the second part is not so much a "chronicle of Flanders" (and does not really narrative les gestes des Flamens et de leurs guerres, "the deeds of the Flemings and their wars", as the author claims), but a chronicle of France. The French and English kings play the leading roles in this second part, and Flanders is only mentioned in passing when it finds itself at war or in alliance with the kings of England or France.

== Flandria Generosa C ==
=== C manuscripts in Latin ===
The Catalogus et chronica principum et comitum Flandriae, in short the Catalogus, is considered the ancestor of the Flandria Generosa C tradition. This Latin text is a continuation and thorough rewriting of the Continuatio Claromariscensis (from the Abbey of Clairmarais). About nine to twelve manuscripts of the Catalogus have been preserved; all of them date from the second half of the 15th century. (Note: According to Lisa Demets (2020), the nine manuscripts of the Catalogus et chronica principum et comitum Flandriae are: 1. Bruges, Stadsarchief, Gilliodts 98; 2. Brussels, Royal Library KBR, 3599–3601; 3. Brussels, Royal Library KBR, II 3743; 4. Hamburg, Staats- und Universitätsbibliothek, Hist. 14; 5. Lille (Rijsel), Bibliothèque Municipale, 327; 6. Paris, Bibliothèque nationale de France, Lat. 5041; 7. Paris, Bibliothèque nationale de France, Lat. 5237; 8. Paris, Bibliothèque nationale de France, Lat. 5994; 9. Rome, Biblioteca Apostolica Vaticana, Regina Christina 798 (olim 1222). According to Veronique Lambert (1988), there were eight manuscripts of "Flandria Generosa C without continuations (621–1423)" and four manuscripts "with continuations"; in addition to the aforementioned nine, these were: Berlin, Königliche Bibliothek Cod. Phil. Rect. 35 (continuation until 1462 or 1467?); The Hague, Royal Library KB, Gérard 270 (this manuscript has been destroyed; it was a copy of the aforementioned Berlin manuscript); Paris, Bibliothèque nationale de France, Beluze 43.) The manuscripts of the Catalogus alias Flandria Generosa C continue until 1423, although the abrupt break from annalistic style in 1411 to fragmentary additions about major events between 1415 and 1423 (in some manuscripts even further) suggests that the original text of the Catalogus ended in 1411.

=== C manuscripts in Middle Dutch ===
The Latin text of the Catalogus formed the basis for edited translations into Middle Dutch, which produced the first prose chronicles of Flanders. In 2014, researchers Dumolyn, Oosterman, Snijders & Villerius (2014) and subsequently Lisa Demets (2016) proposed that all Middle Dutch C manuscripts should be called Excellente Cronike van Vlaenderen (Excellent Chronicle of Flanders), whereas earlier scholars used that name only for a subgroup of manuscripts, or reserved it for the printed publication carrying that title by Willem Vorsterman (1531).

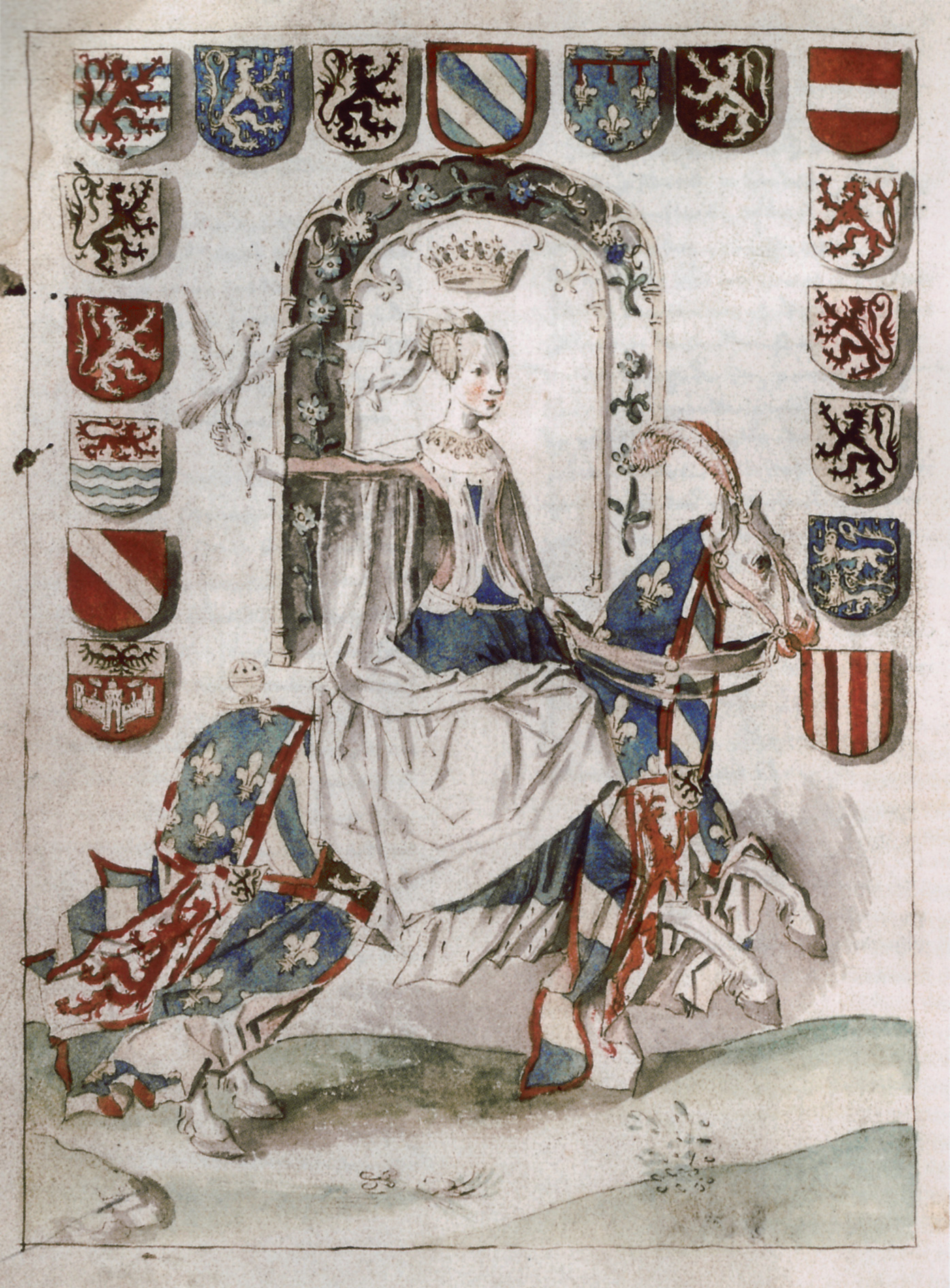
Mary of Burgundy ("the Rich") depicted in the Excellente Cronyke van Vlaenderen (manuscript Bruges Public Library 437), folio 361v. (c. 1490).

As of 2016, according to Lisa Demets, there were 19 known C manuscripts in Middle Dutch (which she and Dumolyn et al. all considered to be Excellente Cronike manuscripts), dating from between 1480 and 1550:

1. Bruges Public Library, 436
2. Bruges Public Library, 437
3. Brussels, Royal Library KBR 7384
4. Brussels, Royal Library KBR 18002
5. Brussels, Royal Library KBR 19562
6. Brussels, Royal Library KBR 21888
7. Brussels, Royal Library KBR 13073–74
8. Brussels, Royal Library KBR 18280–83
9. Brussels, Royal Library KBR II 1934
10. Brussels, Royal Library KBR II 2312
11. Brussels, Royal Library KBR IV 579
12. Brussels, Royal Library KBR Fonds Goethals, G 136
13. Douai, Bibliothèque municipale, 1100
14. Ghent University Library UB 433
15. Ghent University Library UB 590; according to earlier scholars, this manuscript does not belong to the Excellente Cronike tradition, but to an independent branch of Flandria Generosa.
16. Ghent University Library UB G 6181; the chronicle of (pseudo-)Jan van Dixmude, which, according to other researchers, does not belong to the Excellente Cronike tradition, but constitutes an independent branch of Flandria Generosa.
17. New York, Pierpont Morgan Library, 435
18. Paris, Bibliothèque nationale de France, Néerlandais 106
19. The Hague, Royal Library KB 132 A 13

Furthermore, there is the printed version of Willem Vorsterman in Antwerp in 1531.
Demets (2016) grouped Brussels, Royal Library KBR 6074 with the Excellente Cronike manuscripts as well, but did not count it amongst the 19 manuscripts.

Eline Loncke (2007) identified the following manuscripts as also closely related to the Excellente Cronike:

- The Hague, Royal Library KB 1084 B 15
- Brussels, Royal Library KBR II 117
- Brussels, Royal Library KBR II 149

=== Grouping of the C manuscripts in Middle Dutch ===
19th-century researchers such as Lambin, Serrure, Blommaert en De Smet (1839–1856) and later Victor Fris (1899) divided these C manuscripts in Middle Dutch into three traditions:

- manuscript Ghent University Library G 6181, known as the "chronicle of (pseudo-)Jan van Dixmude", until the year 1436. Previously, Lambin (1839) erroneously attributed the name "Jan van Dixmude" to a monk from Ypres (Ieper) around 1440, but in all likelihood he was an author/copyist from Ghent around 1510–1520. A short continuation up to 1440 is known, published by De Smet (1837), but the manuscript was subsequently lost during the Battle of Ypres during the First World War.
- manuscript Ghent University Library 590, until the year 1467, published in 1839/40 by Serrure and Blommaert under the name Kronijk van Vlaenderen.
- manuscripts of the Excellente Cronike van Vlaenderen, with an addendum up to 1482, plus the Vorsterman edition of 1531 with an addendum up to 1514.

Grouping of manuscripts of the Excellente Cronike van Vlaenderen (Dumolyn et al. 2014 and Demets 2016)
| Bruges cluster | Ghent cluster | Others |
|---|---|---|
| Bruges 436; Bruges 437; The Hague 132A13; Douai 1100; Brussels 13073–74; New York 435; Paris Néerl. 106; (Vorsterman 1531) | Ghent 433; Ghent 590; Ghent G 6181; Brussels 19562; Brussels IV 579 | Brussels 7384; Brussels 18002; Brussels 21888; Brussels 18280–83; Brussels II 1934; Brussels II 2312; Brussels G 136; (Brussels 6074) |

Until 2014, researchers, archives, bibliographies, etc. followed this three-way division, even though the evidence for this grouping was not particularly strong. Dumolyn, Oosterman, Snijders & Villerius (2014) and thereafter Lisa Demets (2016) criticised the classification of 19th-century researchers, particularly with regard to the Excellente Cronike branch, which cannot be easily classified taxonomically according to a conventional stemma codicum as developed by Karl Lachmann (1793–1851). According to Dumolyn et al. and Demets, the contents and mutual influence of these late medieval manuscripts proved to be quite fluid upon closer inspection; moreover, they were constantly adapted to local, family or personal circumstances or ideologies. Mutual relationships are therefore difficult to demonstrate, let alone visualise in a hierarchical order.

Instead, Dumolyn et al. proposed urban "branches" or "families", including a "Bruges branch". (Douai 1100; Bruges 436 and 437; Brussels 13073–84; New York 435; The Hague 132A13, Paris Néerl. 106) and a "Ghent branch" (Ghent G 6181, Ghent 433, Ghent 590, Brussels 19562 and IV 579), while they attributed a "more general 'Flemish' perspective" to the three remaining manuscripts (Brussels 21880, 18002 and Brussels II 1934; they associated the last one with Oudenaarde/Ename). Demets (2016) elaborated on this new grouping, and called them 'clusters', in which she identified approximately the same 7 Bruges and 5 Ghent manuscripts, plus an additional number of other manuscripts. (Note: Dumolyn et al. assumed there were 15 manuscripts in total. Demets wrote about 19 manuscripts, plus Brussels 6074, as well as Vorsterman 1531, which arguably belonged to the Bruges cluster due to its close resemblance to Douai 1100.)

A significant problem is that all the evidence that has been handed down was produced after the year 1450. Ann Kelders (1990) even dated all Latin manuscripts of the type Flandria Generosa C after the year 1470. Lisa Demets (2016) vadded that all surviving C manuscripts in Middle Dutch dated from the 1480s or later. Remarkably, the oldest preserved manuscript, dating from 1452, is written in Italian, under the title Cronache de singniori di Fiandra. From a linguistic point of view, it was probably translated from a Latin manuscript that closely resembles the Catalogus and then continued until the year 1440; this would make it older than the chronicle of pseudo-Jan van Dixmude. Furthermore, Demets observed: "In contrast to what researchers have long believed, there are as many variations in the earlier sections of the Excellente Cronike as there are in the fifteenth-century parts, indicating that different writers made distinct translations from different Latin manuscripts at numerous times."

== Bibliography ==
=== Critical editions ===
- Geneologia Comitum Flandriae, edited by L.C. Bethmann, Monumenta Germaniae Historica Scriptores, Volme 9, 1861, pp. 305–312.(digitalised edition).
- Georges GALOPIN en Georges COLVENIER (reds.), Flandria Generosa seu Compendiosa series Genealogiae comitum Flandriae, 1643, Montibus, Ex typographia Waudraei filii (Uitgave van 1781).
- Chronicon Comitum Flandrensium, in: Joseph Jean DE SMET (red.), Corpus chronicorum Flandriae - Recueil des chroniques de Flandre, Volume I, Brussels, Hayez, 1837, pp. 34–257.

=== Literature ===
- Demets, Lisa (1 January 2016). "The Late Medieval Manuscript Transmission of the Excellente Cronike van Vlaenderen in Urban Flanders". The Medieval Low Countries.
- Demets, Lisa (1 January 2020). "De Flandria Generosa C. Een kroniek van Vlaanderen uit de Brugse Eeckhoutabdij aan het begin van de vijftiende eeuw" [The Flandria Generosa C. A chronicle of Flanders from the Eeckhout Abbey in Bruges at the beginning of the fifteenth century]. Handelingen van het Genootschap voor Geschiedenis (in Dutch).
- Dumolyn, Jan; Oosterman, Johan; Snijders, Tjamke; Villerius, Stijn (2014). "Rewriting Chronicles in an Urban Environment: The Middle Dutch 'Excellent Chronicle of Flanders' Tradition". Lias (2): 85–116. doi:10.2143/LIAS.41.2.3064603. ISSN 2033-4753.
- Klaas Millet, (2007) Van Chronicon Hanoniense tot Flandria Illustrata: de beeldvorming rond Boudewijn van Constantinopel, zijn dochter Johanna en de “valse” Boudewijn in de verhalende bronnen van de twaalfde tot de zeventiende eeuw.. [From Chronicon Hanoniense to Flandria Illustrata: the image of Baldwin of Constantinople, his daughter Joanna and the “false” Baldwin in narrative sources from the twelfth to the seventeenth century]. Thesis, Ghent University.
- "Flandria Generosa B". Narrative Sources (in Dutch). 16 March 2012.
- "Cathalogus et cronica principum et comitum Flandrie et forestariorum que terra olim dicebatur terra de buc vel nemus regionis sine misericordia etc Flandria Generosa C". Narrative Sources (in Dutch). 24 June 2011.
- Lambert, Veronique (1988). De kronieken van Vlaanderen 1164–1520: een overzicht, met bijzondere aandacht voor hun basis, de 'Genealogia comitum Flandriae' (Flandria Generosa) [The Chronicles of Flanders 1164–1520: an overview, with particular attention to their basis, the ‘Genealogia comitum Flandriae’ (Flandria Generosa)] (in Dutch). Ghent University.
- Loncke, Eline (2007). De kronieken van Vlaanderen. Uitgave en studie van het handschrift 436 van de Stadsbibliotheek te Brugge [The Chronicles of Flanders. Publication and study of manuscript 436 from the Bruges City Library] (PDF) (in Dutch). Ghent University. (Cronicke van Vlaendren. Dit es de tafle van der Cornicke van Vlaenderen...).
- Vandekerckhove, Simon (2007). De Chronike van den lande van Vlaendre: Studie van het handschrift en uitgave van f° 148v. tot f° 415v (PDF) (in Dutch). Ghent University. (manuscript 1100 Bibliothèque municipal de Douai).
