= Nieuw-Namen =

- Village
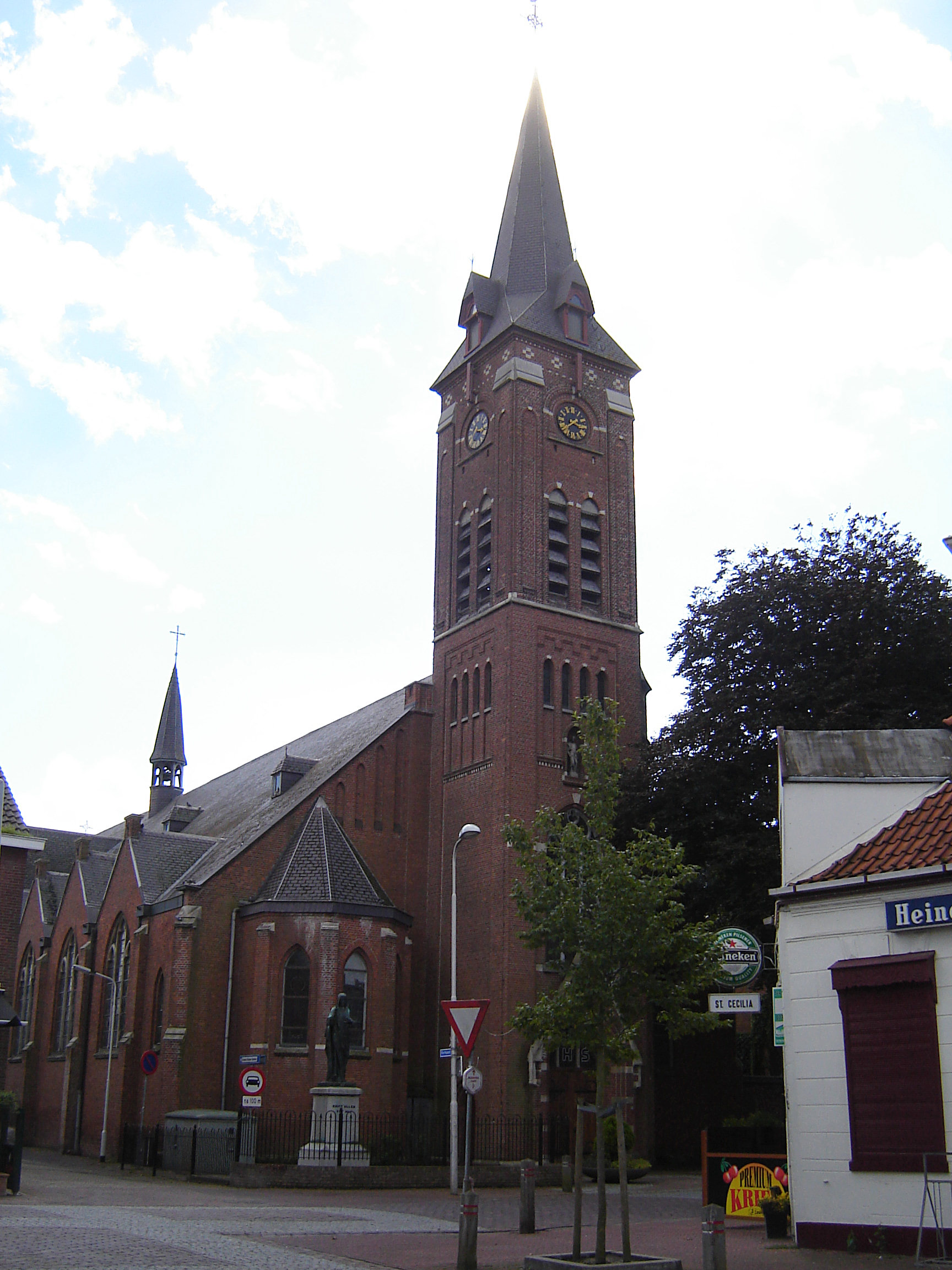
- St Josef Church

- Location in the province of Zeeland in the Netherlands Nieuw-Namen (Netherlands)
- Coordinates: 51°17′35″N 4°9′44″E
- Country: Netherlands
- Province: Zeeland
- Municipality: Hulst

Area
  - Total: 45.64 km^{2} (17.62 sq mi)
- Elevation: 4.8 m (16 ft)

Population (2021)
  - Total: 955
  - Density: 20.9/km^{2} (54.2/sq mi)
- Time zone: UTC+1 (CET)
  - Summer (DST): UTC+2 (CEST)
- Postal code: 4568
- Dialing code: 0114

Nieuw-Namen is a village in the Dutch province of Zeeland. It is a part of the municipality of Hulst, and lies about 24 km south of Bergen op Zoom. The village is located on the border with the Belgium, and forms a single urban area with the Belgian village of Kieldrecht.

== History ==
The village was first mentioned in 1136 as Hulsterlo. From 1874 onwards, it became Nieuw-Namen, and means the new village Namen which was flooded and was named after Jan van Namen who built dikes in the area.

The poem Van den vos Reynaerde was supposed to have taken place in Nieuw-Namen. "Int oestende van Vlaenderen staet een bosch, ende hiet Hulsterloo". Translation: "In the eastern end of Flanders, there is a forest and it is called Hulsterloo (old name)".

Nieuw-Namen was home to 701 people in 1840. The village used to be part of the municipality of Clinge. In 1970, it became part of the municipality of Hulst.
