= Hildegard of Bingen bibliography =

Bibliography of works by and about Hildegard of Bingen

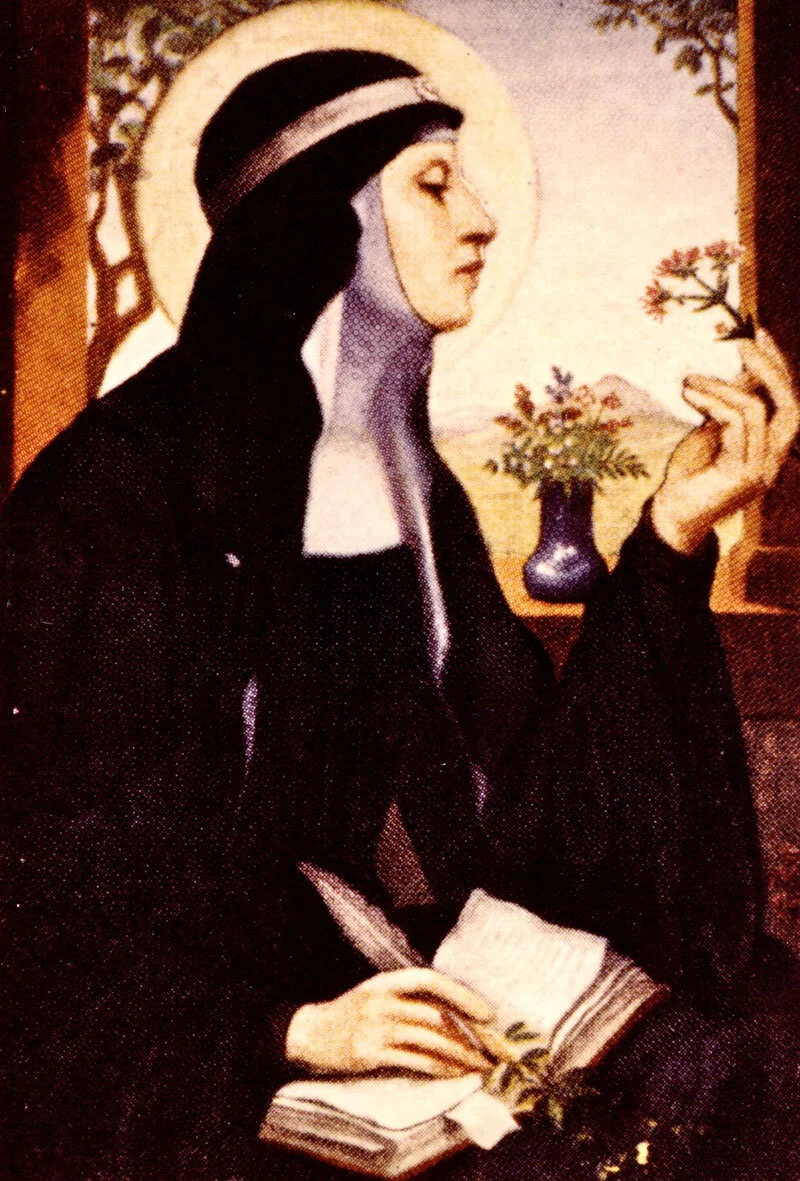
Hildegard of Bingen

This bibliography lists major editions, translations, and collected works of Hildegard of Bingen. It includes critical Latin editions of her visionary texts, correspondence, musical compositions, hagiography, scientific writings, and modern English translations, with references to major scholarly series such as the Corpus Christianorum.

== Original Latin works ==
=== Correspondence (Epistolarium) ===
- Epistolarium pars prima I–XC, ed. Lieven Van Acker, Corpus Christianorum Continuatio Mediaevalis (CCCM) 91A (Turnhout: Brepols, 1991).
- Epistolarium pars secunda XCI–CCLr, ed. Lieven Van Acker, CCCM 91B (Turnhout: Brepols, 1993).
- Epistolarium pars tertia CCLI–CCCXC, ed. Lieven Van Acker and M. Klaes-Hachmöller, CCCM 91C (Turnhout: Brepols, 2001).

=== Visionary and doctrinal works ===
- Liber vitae meritorum, ed. Angela Carlevaris, CCCM 90 (Turnhout: Brepols, 1995).
- Liber divinorum operum, eds. Albert Derolez and Peter Dronke, CCCM 92 (Turnhout: Brepols, 1996).
- Scivias, eds. Adelgundis Führkötter and Angela Carlevaris, CCCM 43–43A (Corpus Christianorum Scholars Version) (Turnhout: Brepols, 2003).

=== Scientific, medical, and short theological works ===
- Causae et curae, ed. Paul Kaiser (Leipzig: Teubner, 1903).
- Causae et curae, ed. L. Moulinier (Berlin: Akademie Verlag, 2003).
- Hildegardis Bingensis, Opera minora, eds. H. Feiss, C. Evans, B.M. Kienzle, C. Muessig, B. Newman, and Peter Dronke, CCCM 226 (Turnhout: Brepols, 2007). ISBN 978-2-503-05261-8
- Hildegardis Bingensis, Opera minora II, eds. C.P. Evans, J. Deploige, S. Moens, M. Embach, and K. Gärtner, CCCM 226A (Turnhout: Brepols, 2015). ISBN 978-2-503-54837-1

=== Hagiography and linguistic texts ===
- Gottfried of Disibodenberg and Theoderich of Echternach, Vita sanctae Hildegardis, ed. Monika Klaes, CCCM 126 (Turnhout: Brepols, 1993).
- Hildegardis Bingensis, Vita sancti Rupperti confessoris; Vita sancti Dysibodi episcopi, ed. and trans. Hugh Feiss and Christopher P. Evans, Dallas Medieval Texts and Translations 11 (Leuven and Paris: Peeters, 2010).
- Hildegard of Bingen’s Unknown Language: An Edition, Translation, and Discussion, ed. Sarah Higley (Rochester: Boydell & Brewer, 2007). Available online.

=== Musical works ===
- Lieder (Salzburg: Otto Müller Verlag, 1969), modern edition in adapted square notation.
- Hildegardis Bingensis, Werke Band IV: Lieder Symphoniae, ed. Barbara Stühlmeyer (Beuroner Kunstverlag, 2012). ISBN 978-3-87071-263-1
- Marianne Richert Pfau, Hildegard von Bingen: Symphonia, 8 vols. (Bryn Mawr: Hildegard Publishing Company, 1990).

== Early printed collections ==
- Jacques-Paul Migne, ed. Sanctae Hildegardis Abbatissae Opera Omnia, Patrologia Latina 197 (Paris: Migne, 1855).
- Jean-Baptiste Pitra, ed. Analecta Sanctae Hildegardis Opera, Analecta Sacra, vol. 8 (Monte Cassino: Typis Sacri Montis Casinensis, 1882).

== Related medieval sources ==
- Albert Derolez, ed. Guibert of Gembloux, Epistolae, CCCM 66–66A (Turnhout: Brepols, 1988–1989).

== Modern English translations (selected) ==
The following table lists major modern translations of Hildegard’s works.

Title	Translator(s)	Publisher & Year	ISBN
Scivias	Mother Columba Hart, Jane Bishop	Paulist Press, 1990	ISBN 978-0-8091-3241-7
Book of Divine Works	Nathaniel M. Campbell	Catholic University of America Press, 2018	ISBN 978-0-8132-3108-8
The Letters of Hildegard of Bingen, 3 vols.	Joseph L. Baird, Radd K. Ehrman	Oxford University Press, 1994–2004	ISBN 0-19-508937-5
The Personal Correspondence of Hildegard of Bingen	Joseph L. Baird	Oxford University Press, 2006	ISBN 0-19-530823-9
The Book of the Rewards of Life (Liber vitae meritorum)	Bruce W. Hozeski	Oxford University Press, 1997	ISBN 0-19-511371-3
Hildegard of Bingen: Selected Writings	Mark Atherton	Penguin Classics, 2001	ISBN 978-0-14-043604-4
Hildegard of Bingen: A Spiritual Reader	Carmen Acevedo Butcher	Paraclete Press, 2007	
Secrets of God: Writings of Hildegard of Bingen	Sabina Flanagan	Shambhala Publications, 1996	
Physica	Priscilla Throop	Inner Traditions, 1998	ISBN 0-89281-661-9
Causae et curae	Priscilla Throop	MedievalMS, 2006/2008	
Three Lives and a Rule	Priscilla Throop	MedievalMS, 2010	
Book of Divine Works, with Letters and Songs	ed. Matthew Fox; trans. Robert Cunningham et al.	Bear & Company, 1987	
The Life of Holy Hildegard	Adelgundis Führkötter, James McGrath	The Liturgical Press, 1980	
Explanation of the Rule of St. Benedict	Hugh Feiss	Peregrina, 1996	
The Life of Hildegard of Bingen	Hugh Feiss	Peregrina, 1996	
Hildegard of Bingen: Symphonia	Barbara Newman (ed. and trans.)	Cornell University Press, 1998	
Hildegard of Bingen: An Anthology	Fiona Bowie, Oliver Davies (eds.)	SPCK, 1990	
Meditations with Hildegard of Bingen	Gabriele Uhlein	Bear & Company, 1982	

== Secondary scholarship ==
(This section may be expanded with major studies, companions, or monographs.)
