= Comburg Manuscript =

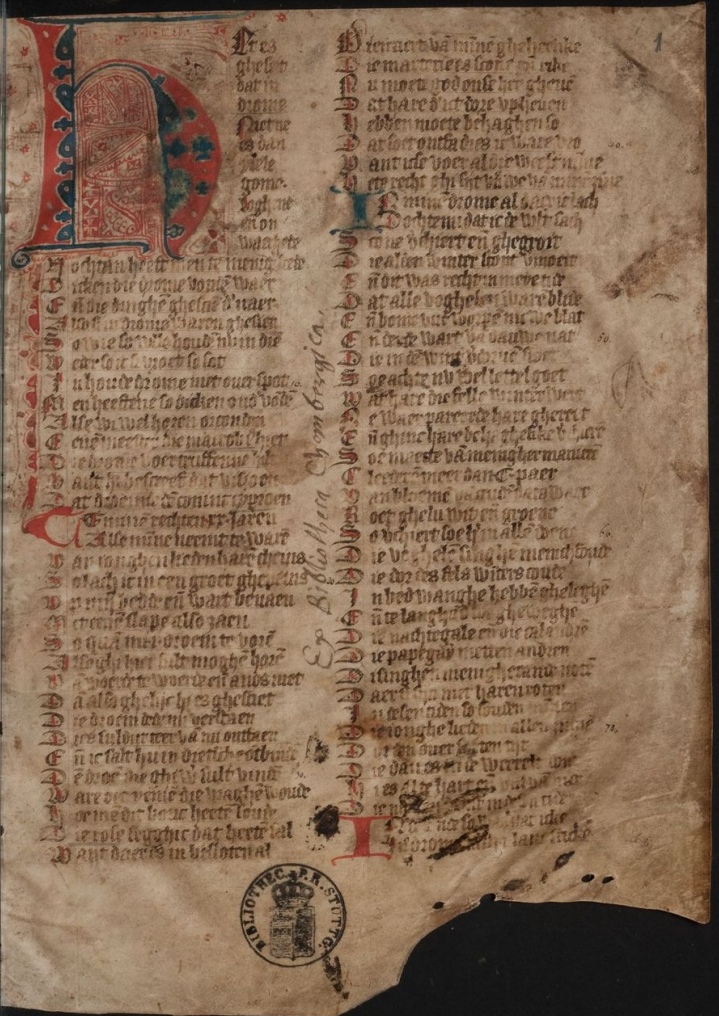
Starting page (fol. 1r)

The Comburg Manuscript (Dutch: Comburgse handschrift; German: Comburger Handschrift) or Comburg Codex (Dutch: Comburgse codex) is a manuscript containing literary texts in Middle Dutch, written between 1380 and 1425 and originating from the vicinity of Ghent. It contains many rare or unique texts and therefore is of inestimable value for Middle Dutch literature, the literature of Flanders and the Netherlands, and medieval Flemish and Dutch culture more broadly.

== Contents ==
This miscellany contains some fifty stories on 346 folios, including:

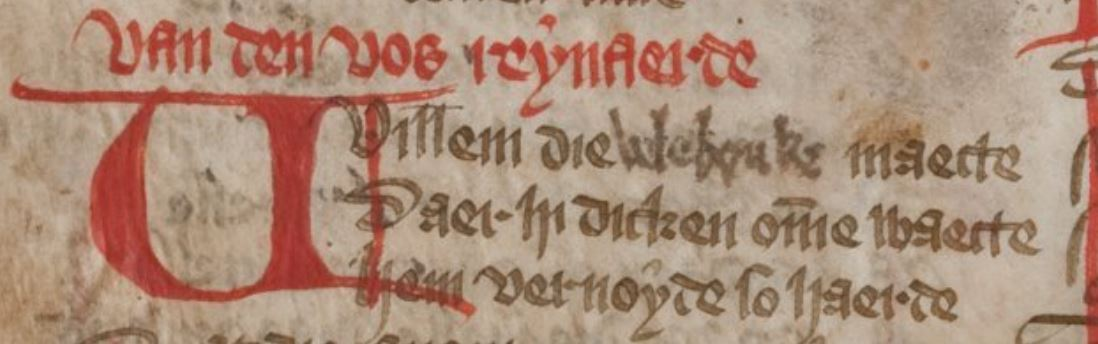
Opening lines of Van den vos Reynaerde by Willem die ~~Madocke~~ vele bouke maecte. (Note: For some reason, someone defaced the word "Madocke" and replaced it by "vele bouke". Rather than "William who made Madocke", the text now reads "William who made many books". This has led some researchers to speculate that "Madocke" was the title of a story that was later prohibited for some reason, and that the altered text represents a form of censorship. Ultimately, no one knows for sure.)

- a number of works by Jacob van Maerlant (including the well-known strophic poems Martijn)
- Der Leken Spieghel ("The Layperson's Mirror") by Jan van Boendale
- De Boec van Catoene ("The Book of Cato"), a very popular school book
- Van den vos Reynaerde ("Reynard the Fox") by Willem die Madocke maecte.

Some texts have only been preserved in this manuscript, such as several prose pieces, a large number of fables, and:

- the Rhymed Chronicle of Flanders, a history of the County of Flanders from 792 up to the reign of John the Fearless in 1405
- Een dispitacie van Rogiere ende van Janne ("A Disputation of Roger and John") by Jan de Weert
- Sente Bernaerdus epistele ("Epistle of Saint Bernard"), a Middle Dutch version of the story about saint Brendan the Navigator
- Van Zeden ("On Morals"), the Middle Dutch translation of Facetus

== Description ==
=== Physical characteristics ===
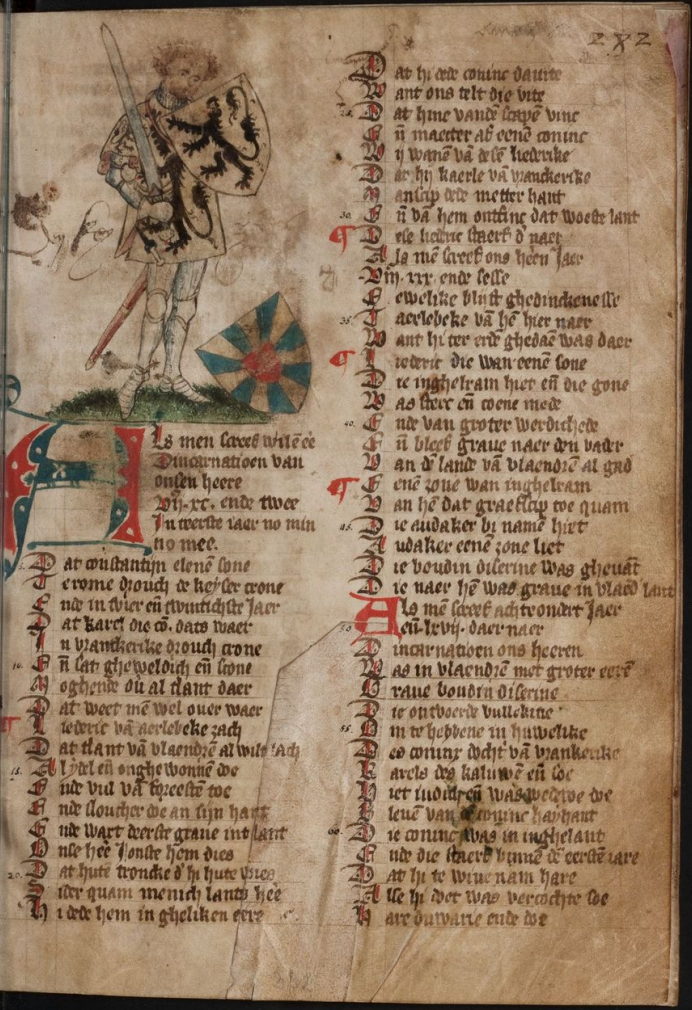
The Rhymed Chronicle of Flanders's first page contains the only miniature: an image of Flemish count Philip of Alsace (fol. 282r).

The Comburg Manuscript is not a beautiful, finely crafted illuminated manuscript with lavish miniatures, as is often imagined. The parchment is of poor quality, uneven and pigmented, with holes in it, and it is poorly bound. It contains only one graphically elaborate initial and a single drawing of the Flemish count Philip of Alsace on folio 282, at the beginning of the Rhymed Chronicle of Flanders. The miniature depicts a new legend, namely that Philip exchanged the old azure-gules coat of arms of the legendary forestiers for the rampant black lion (later known as the "Flemish lion"), which he is said to have brought back from the Holy Land with his crusaders. (Note: Rhymed Chronicle of Flanders, verses 4983–4889: Van den soudaen saladijn / In dese reise verstaet den fijn / Ouer zee int heleghe lant / Hief up philips van vlaendrenlant / Den scilt van goude metten zwarten lioene / Die hi vort an als prinse coene / Voerde ende liet de wapine varen / Daer sine vorders met verwapent waren. ("From the Sudanese Saladin / In this journey, understands the attuned listener / Across the sea in the Holy Land / Philip of Flanders raised / The shield of gold with black lions / Which he carried as a brave prince / Brought and had the coat of arms shipped / To where his men were armed with it.")) The Rhymed Chronicle of Flanders and the chronicle of John Iperius (c. 1390) are the earliest accounts to claim this for the first time, two hundred years after Philip's death.

Perhaps the Comburg Manuscript was a kind of library catalogue, written in the storytelling tradition of the time, which could be consulted by anyone who wanted to order a story, which would then be carefully and skilfully copied. Although the codex does not contain any prices for the copying services and orders, the number of verses allows us to assume that professional copyists were at work here.

=== Rhymed Chronicle of Flanders ===
Modern researchers assume that no fewer than nine different hands worked on the text. The Rhymed Chronicle of Flanders alone, which covers approximately the last 20% of the pages, was written by four different hands. The Rhymed Chronicle consists of 10,571 verses (10,569 according to older counts) and is compiled from at least five sources:

- From 792 to 1164, it is a translation of the Old French Li générations, li parole et li lignie de le lignie des contes de Flandres, which in turn is a translation of the Latin Flandria Generosa B. Due to some lacunae, it is suspected that the first scribe did not compose this rhyming text himself, but copied it from someone else.
- From 1164 to 1329, it is a translation of the Latin Continuatio Claromariscensis (both the edition up to 1214 and the edition up to 1329), a continuation of Flandria Generosa A. Halfway through Philip of Alsace's reign, the first scribe stopped writing and the second scribe took over until Philip's death (1191), after which the third scribe continued the translation.
- From 1329 to 1347, the third hand used the Middle French Chronique Normande abrégée (or its derivative continuation, the Chroniques abrégées of Baldwin of Avesnes, which are almost identical). The author already knew that the Truce of Calais (entered into force on 28 September 1347) lasted three years, ("wart bestant III jaer"), but did not write about the intervening period of 1347–1350.
- From 1348 to 1404 (the last year mentioned), a fourth text hand wrote, and it is likely to be an original Middle Dutch work by a new author and not just a creative translator/rhymester/copyist. The exact date of composition of this piece is unclear, but based on the information provided, particularly about the children of Philip the Bold, it must have been written during the reign of John the Fearless (r. 1405–1419). (Note: The author wrote that Philip II, Count of Nevers would become count and Anthony, Duke of Brabant would become duke, which they did in 1404 and 1405, respectively. However, he does not seem to have known (yet) that both were killed in the Battle of Agincourt (25 October 1415), nor that the 'Count of Savoy' Amadeus VIII was elevated to duke in 1416. The mention that the 'Duke of Bourbon' married a daughter of Philip the Bold is an anachronism; John I, Duke of Bourbon did not become duke until his father died on 19 August 1410, but he was already widowed from Philip's daughter Bonne in 1398. All this suggests that the author wrote after 1410, but before 1415.)

== Provenance ==
On linguistic, content-related, palaeographic and material grounds, it can be concluded that the codex was produced in the Ghent area between the end of the 14th century and the beginning of the 15th century. It is believed that the manuscript was moved from Brussels to Comburg in 1536, because the Brussels canon Gerhardus von Schwalbach was appointed in that year as the dean abbot of the Comburg Abbey or Ritterstift (located in Schwäbisch Hall on the Comburg in Baden-Württemberg); he would then have taken the codex with him to his new home and workplace. Since Erasmus Neustetter, dean and later provost of the Ritterstift, had his family coat of arms added in 1578, the manuscript must have already been in Comburg at that time.

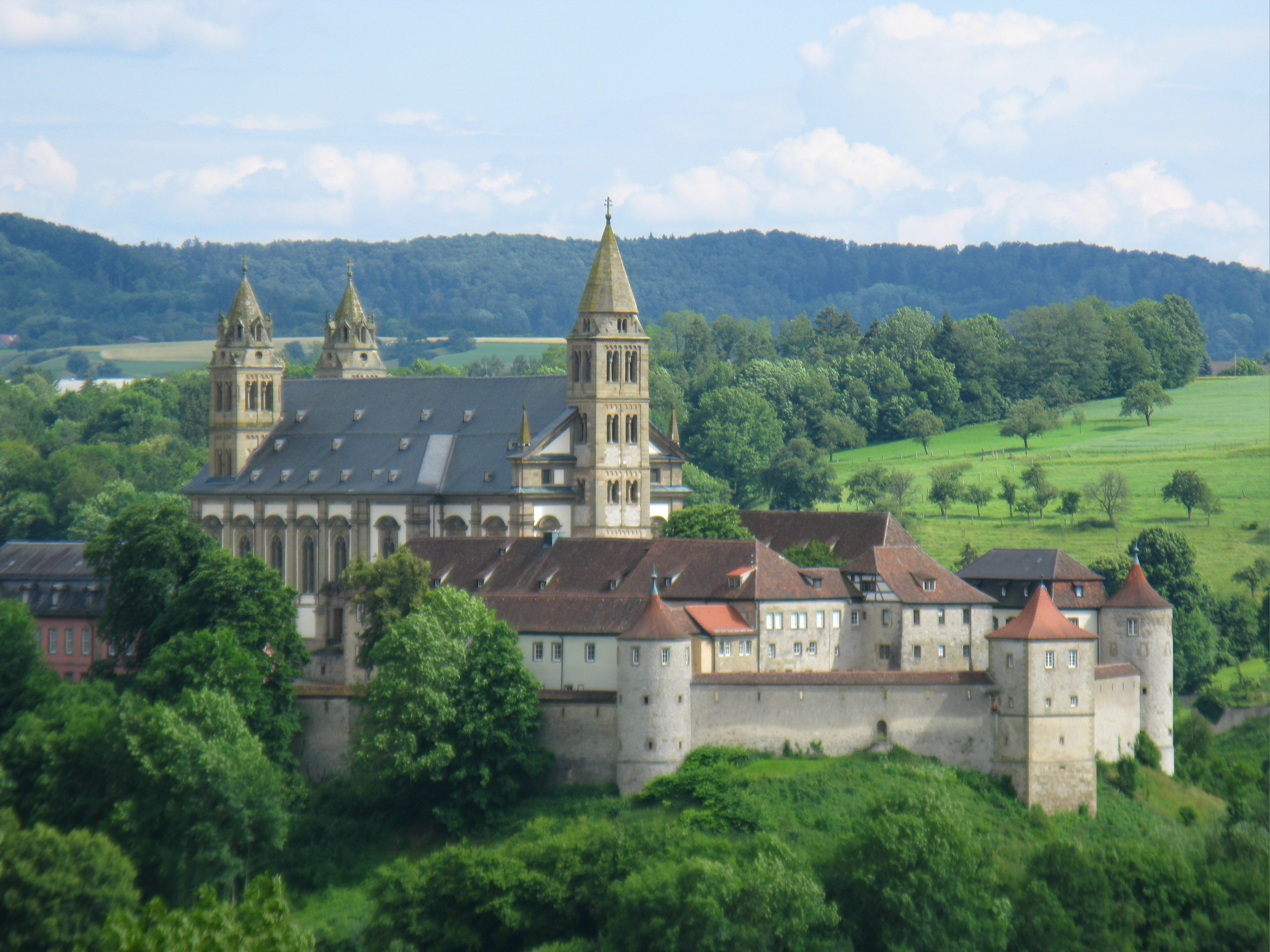
Former Comburg Abbey (photo 2009)

The Stift was dissolved in 1803 by the Reichsdeputationshauptschluss; the possessions went to the Electorate of Württemberg. A short time later, in 1805, F.D. Gräter (1768–1830) discovered the unique manuscript in the library of Comburg, which gave it its name, the 'Comburg Manuscript'. It was kept there until Frederick I, since 1806 king of Württemberg, donated this library to the "Königliche Öffentliche Bibliothek" founded in 1810 in Stuttgart, in 1921 renamed to Württembergische Landesbibliothek. Since then, the manuscript has been kept there under document number Cod. poet. et philol. fol. 22.

== Editions ==
On one occasion – in 1991 – the fragile Comburg Manuscript from the Landesbibliothek was released for photographic reproduction in a facsimile edition of the animal epic Van den vos Reynaerde.

In 1997, a diplomatic edition of the Comburg Manuscript was published by Herman Brinkman and Janny Schenkel at Uitgeverij Verloren.

Around 2011, the entire Comburg Manuscript was digitised. Since then, it has been available for consultation online in the digital library of the Württembergische Landesbibliothek Stuttgart.

== Bibliography ==
=== Primary sources ===
- Digitised copy: Comburger Handschrift – mittelniederländische Sammelhandschrift – Cod.poet.et phil.fol.22"
- Critical edition: Brinkman, Herman; Schenkel, Janny (1997). Het Comburgse handschrift. Hs. Stuttgart, Württembergische Landesbibliothek, Cod. poet. et phil. 2° 22. Volume 2 (PDF) (in Dutch). Hilversum: Verloren. pp. 1229–1492.

=== Literature ===
- Demets, Lisa (1 January 2020). "De Flandria Generosa C. Een kroniek van Vlaanderen uit de Brugse Eeckhoutabdij aan het begin van de vijftiende eeuw". Handelingen van het Genootschap voor Geschiedenis (in Dutch).
- Jozef D. Janssens, De Comburgse codex, in: Literatuur. Tijdschrift over Nederlandse letterkunde, 1991, pp. 380–381
- Lambert, Veronique (1988). De kronieken van Vlaanderen 1164–1520: een overzicht, met bijzondere aandacht voor hun basis, de 'Genealogia comitum Flandriae' (Flandria Generosa) (in Dutch). Universiteit Gent.
- J. de Vos, "Een Gentse codex in Stuttgart", in: J. Janssens et al., Van den Vos Reynaerde. Het Comburgse handschrift, Leuven, Davidsfonds, 1991
