= Chronicle =

Historical account of facts and events

The Illuminated Chronicle from the royal Hungarian court from 1358

A chronicle (Latin: chronica, from Greek χρονικά chroniká, from χρόνος, chrónos – "time") is a historical account of events arranged in chronological order, as in a timeline. Typically, equal weight is given for historically important events and local events, the purpose being the recording of events that occurred, seen from the perspective of the chronicler. A chronicle which traces world history is a universal chronicle. This is in contrast to a narrative or history, in which an author chooses events to interpret and analyze and excludes those the author does not consider important or relevant.

The information sources for chronicles vary. Some are written from the chronicler's direct knowledge, others from witnesses or participants in events, still others are accounts passed down from generation to generation by oral tradition. Some used written material, such as charters, letters, and earlier chronicles. Still others are tales of unknown origin that have mythical status. Copyists also changed chronicles in creative copying, making corrections or in updating or continuing a chronicle with information not available to the original chronicler. Determining the reliability of particular chronicles is important to historians.

Many newspapers and other periodical literature have adopted "chronicle" as part of their name.

== Subgroups ==
"It is well known that history, in the form of Chronicles, was a favourite portion of the literature of the middle ages. The annals of a country were usually kept according to the years of the sovereign's power, and not those of the Christian æra. The Chronicles compiled in large cities were arranged in like manner, with the years reckoned according to the annual succession of chief magistrates."

— John Gough Nichols, critical edition foreword to Chronicle of the Grey Friars of London (1852)

Scholars categorize the genre of chronicle into two subgroups: live chronicles, and dead chronicles. A dead chronicle is one where the author assembles a list of events up to the time of their writing, but does not record further events as they occur. A live chronicle is where one or more authors add to a chronicle in a regular fashion, recording contemporary events shortly after they occur. Because of the immediacy of the information, historians tend to value live chronicles, such as annals, over dead ones.

The term often refers to a book written by a chronicler in the Middle Ages describing historical events in a country, or the lives of a nobleman or a clergyman, although it is also applied to a record of public events. The earliest medieval chronicle to combine both retrospective (dead) and contemporary (live) entries, is the Chronicle of Ireland, which spans the years 431 to 911.

Chronicles are the predecessors of modern "time lines" rather than analytical histories. They represent accounts, in prose or verse, of local or distant events over a considerable period of time, both the lifetime of the individual chronicler and often those of several subsequent continuators. If the chronicles deal with events year by year, they are often called annals. Unlike the modern historian, most chroniclers tended to take their information as they found it, and made little attempt to separate fact from legend. The point of view of most chroniclers is highly localised, to the extent that many anonymous chroniclers can be sited in individual abbeys.

It is impossible to say how many chronicles exist, as the many ambiguities in the definition of the genre make it impossible to draw clear distinctions of what should or should not be included. However, the Encyclopedia of the Medieval Chronicle lists some 2,500 items written between 300 and 1500 AD.

== Citation of entries ==
Entries in chronicles are often cited using the abbreviation s.a., meaning sub anno (under the year), according to the year under which they are listed. For example, "ASC MS A, s.a. 855" means the entry for the year 855 in manuscript A of the Anglo-Saxon Chronicle. The same event may be recorded under a different year in another manuscript of the chronicle, and may be cited for example as "ASC MS D, s.a. 857".

== English chronicles ==
The most important English chronicles are the Anglo-Saxon Chronicle, started under the patronage of King Alfred in the 9th century and continued until the 12th century, and the Chronicles of England, Scotland and Ireland (1577–87) by Raphael Holinshed and other writers; the latter documents were important sources of materials for Elizabethan drama. Later 16th-century Scottish chronicles, written after the Reformation, shape history according to Catholic or Protestant viewpoints.

== Cronista ==
A cronista is a term for a historical chronicler, a role that held historical significance in the European Middle Ages. Until the European Enlightenment, the occupation was largely equivalent to that of a historian, describing events chronologically that were of note in a given country or region. As such, it was often an official governmental position rather than an independent practice. The appointment of the official chronicler often favored individuals who had distinguished themselves by their efforts to study, investigate and disseminate population-related issues. The position was granted on a local level based on the mutual agreements of a city council in plenary meetings. Often, the occupation was honorary, unpaid, and stationed for life. In modern usage, the term usually refers to a type of journalist who writes chronicles as a form of journalism or non-professional historical documentation.

=== Cronistas in the Middle Ages ===
Before the development of modern journalism and the systematization of chronicles as a journalistic genre, cronistas were tasked with narrating chronological events considered worthy of remembrance that were recorded year by year. Unlike writers who created epic poems regarding living figures, cronistas recorded historical events in the lives of individuals in an ostensibly truthful and reality-oriented way.

Even from the time of early Christian historiography, cronistas were clearly expected to place human history in the context of a linear progression, starting with the creation of man until the second coming of Christ, as detailed in biblical texts.

== Lists of chronicles ==
- Babylonian Chronicles (loosely-defined set of 25 clay tablets)
- Burmese chronicles
- Cambodian Royal Chronicles (loosely-defined collection)
- List of collections of Crusader sources (most of them chronicles)
- List of Danish chronicles
- List of English chronicles
- List of Hungarian chronicles
- List of Rus' chronicles
- Muslim chronicles for Indian history
- Chronicles of Nepal
- Serbian chronicles
- List of Spanish chronicles

=== Alphabetical list of notable chronicles ===
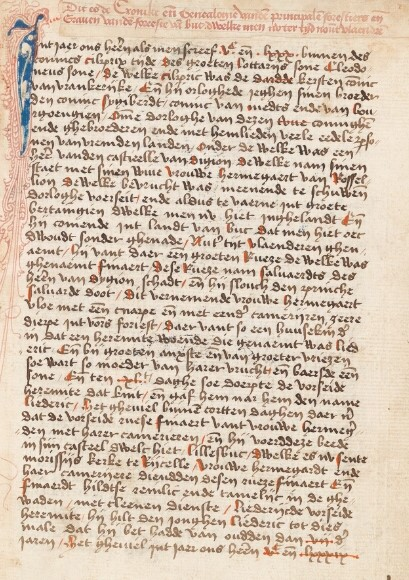
Chronicles of Flanders. Manuscript manufactured in Flanders, 2nd half of the 15th century. Manuscript preserved in the University Library of Ghent.

- History of Alam Aray Abbasi – Safavid Iran
- Alamgirnama – Mughal Empire
- Alexandrian World Chronicle – Greek history of the world until 392 AD
- Altan Tobchi – Mongol Empire
- Anglo-Saxon Chronicle – England
- Annales Bertiniani – West Francia
- Annales Cambriae – Wales
- Annales Posonienses – Kingdom of Hungary
- Annales seu cronicae incliti Regni Poloniae – Poland
- Annals of Inisfallen – Ireland
- Annals of Lough Cé – Ireland
- Annals of the Four Masters – Ireland
- Annals of Spring and Autumn – China
- Annals of Thutmose III – Ancient Egypt
- Veritable Records of the Joseon Dynasty – Korea
- Babylonian Chronicles – Mesopotamia
- Anonymous Bulgarian Chronicle – Bulgaria
- Barnwell Chronicle – England
- Bodhi Vamsa – Sri Lanka
- Books of Chronicles attributed to Ezra – Israel
- Buranji – Ahoms, Assam, India
- Bychowiec Chronicle Lithuania
- Cāmadevivaṃsa – Northern Thailand
- Culavamsa – Sri Lanka
- (Chronica Polonorum): see Gesta principum Polonorum
- Cheitharol Kumbaba – Manipur, India
- Chronica Gentis Scotorum
- Chronica Hungarorum – History of Hungary
- Chronica seu originale regum et principum Poloniae – Poland
- Chronicle of 754 – Spain
- Chronicle (Crònica) by Ramon Muntaner – 13th/14th-century Crown of Aragon. Third and longest of the Grand Catalan Chronicles.
- Chronicle of Finland (Chronicon Finlandiae) by Johannes Messenius – Finland
- Chronicle of Fredegar – France
- Chronicle of the Slavs – Europe
- Chronicle of Greater Poland – Poland
- Chronicle of Jean de Venette – France
- Chronicle of the Bishops of England (De Gestis Pontificum Anglorum) by William of Malmesbury
- Chronicles of Jerahmeel
- Chronicle of the Kings of Alba – Scotland
- Chronicle of the Kings of England (De Gestis Regum Anglorum) by William of Malmesbury
- Chronicles of Mann - Isle of Man
- Chronicon of Eusebius
- Chronicon Scotorum – Ireland
- Chronicon of Thietmar of Merseburg
- Chronicon Paschale – 7th century Greek chronicle of the world
- Chronicon Pictum – History of Hungary
- Chronographia – 11th century History of the Eastern Roman Empire (Byzantium) by Michael Psellos
- Comentarios Reales de los Incas
- Conversion of Kartli – Georgia
- Cronaca- Chronicle of Cyprus from the 4th up to the 15th century by Cypriot chronicler Leontios Machairas
- Cronaca fiorentina – Chronicle of Florence up to the end of the 14th Century by Baldassarre Bonaiuti
- Cronicae et gesta ducum sive principum Polonorum – Poland
- Crónica Mexicayotl — History of the Incas
- Croyland Chronicle – England
- Dawn-Breakers (Nabil's Narrative) – Baháʼí Faith and Middle East
- Dioclean Priest's Chronicle – Europe
- Dipavamsa – Sri Lanka
- Divan of the Abkhazian Kings – Georgia
- Epic of Sundiata – West Africa
- Epitome rerum Hungarorum – History of Hungary
- Eric's Chronicle – Sweden
- Eusebius Chronicle – Mediterranean and Middle East
- Flandria Generosa – a family of genealogy-focused chronicles about the County of Flanders
- Fragmentary Annals of Ireland – Ireland
- Froissart's Chronicles – France and Western Europe
- Galician-Volhynian Chronicle – Ukraine
- Georgian Chronicles – Georgia
- Gesta Hungarorum – History of Hungary
- Gesta Hunnorum et Hungarorum – History of Hungary
- Gesta Normannorum Ducum – Normandy
- Gesta principum Polonorum
- Grandes Chroniques de France – France
- General Estoria by Alfonso X – c. 1275–1284 Castile, Spain.
- Henry of Livona Chronicle – Eastern Europe
- Historia Ecclesiastica – Norman England
- Historia Scholastica by Petrus Comestor - 12th century France
- The Historie and Chronicles of Scotland, Robert Lindsay of Pitscottie
- História da Província Santa Cruz a que vulgarmente chamamos Brasil – Brazil
- History of the Prophets and Kings – Middle East and Mediterranean
- Hustyn Chronicle – Eastern Europe
- Jami' al-tawarikh by Rashid-al-Din Hamadani - Universal history
- Jans der Enikel – Europe and Mediterranean
- Jerome's Chronicle – Mediterranean and Middle East
- Jinakalamali – Northern Thailand
- Joannis de Czarnkow chronicon Polonorum – Poland
- Kaiserchronik – Central and southern Europe, Germany
- Kampen chronicles: two separate city chronicles of Kampen, Overijssel, titled De annalibus quaedam and Annalia ende andere copien, roughly covering the 1450–1550 period.
- Kano Chronicle – Nigeria
- Khulasat-ut-Tawarikh by Sujan Rai - History of India
- Khwaday-Namag – History of Persia
- Kievan Chronicle – 12th-century Kievan Rus', mostly modern Ukraine
- Kilwa Chronicle – East Africa
- Kojiki – Japan
- Lethrense Chronicle – Denmark
- Livonian Chronicle of Henry – Livonia
- Livonian Rhymed Chronicle – Livonia
- Libre dels Feyts – Book of the Deeds by James I of Aragon, first of the Grand Catalan Chronicles
- Madala Panji – Chronicle of the Jagannath Temple in Puri, India, related to the History of Odisha
- Mainz Anonymous
- Mahavamsa – Sri Lanka
- Maronite Chronicle – The Levant, anonymous annalistic chronicle in the Syriac language completed shortly after 664.
- Manx Chronicle – Isle of Man
- Nabonidus Chronicle – Mesopotamia
- Nihon Shoki – Japan
- Novgorod First Chronicle – Novgorod Republic
- Nuova Cronica – Florence
- Nuremberg Chronicle
- Old Tibetan Chronicle – History of Tibet
- Parian Chronicle – Ancient Greece
- Paschale Chronicle – Mediterranean
- Pictish Chronicle – Scotland
- Primary Chronicle – Kievan Rus'
- Puranas – India
- Rajatarangini – Kashmir
- Roit and Quheil of Tyme – Scotland, Adam Abell
- Roskildense Chronicle – Denmark
- Royal Frankish Annals – Frankish Empire
- Scotichronicon – by the Scottish historian Walter Bower
- Shahnama-yi-Al-i Osman by Fethullah Arifi Çelebi – Ottoman Empire (1300 ac – the end of Sultan Suleyman I's reign) which is the fifth volume of it Süleymanname
- Skibby Chronicle – Danish Latin chronicle from the 1530s
- Solomon bar Simson Chronicle
- Swiss illustrated chronicles – Switzerland
- Timbuktu Chronicles – Mali
- Zizhi Tongjian – China

=== Rhymed chronicles ===
Rhymed or poetic chronicles, as opposed to prosaic chronicles, include:

- Rhymed Chronicle of 1682
- Rhymed Chronicle of Armenia Minor
- Cronache aquilane ("Chronicle of L'Aquila"), both in prose and verse form
- Brabantsche Yeesten (c. 1315–1351) by Jan van Boendale (continued by an anonymous author)
- Cornicke van Brabant (1415) by Hennen van Merchtenen
- Cronijck van Brabant (c. 1435–1460), anonymous, until 1430
- Rhymed Chronicle of Brunswick
- Rhymed Chronicle of Cologne by Gottfried Hagen
- Chronicle of Dalimil
- Danish Rhymed Chronicle
- Chronicon Egmundanum
- Engelbrekt's Chronicle
- Erik's Chronicle
- Rhymed Chronicle of Flanders, part of the Comburg Manuscript. It is unique, as all other surviving Dutch-language chronicles of Flanders were written in prose.
- Die olde Freesche cronike (1474), anonymous history of Friesland until 1248
- Rhymed Chronicle of Gandersheim
- Rhymed Chronicle of Holland by Melis Stoke
- Karl's Chronicle
- Rhymed Chronicle of Kastl (Kastler Reimchronik)
- Rhymed Chronicle of Klaas Kolijn, notorious 17th-century forgery pretending to be written in the 12th century
- Livonian Rhymed Chronicle
- Rhymed Chronicle of Mecklenburg by Ernest of Kirchberg
- Chronique métrique de Philippe le Bel or Chronique rimée (1316) by Geoffrey of Paris
- Chronique rimée (c. 1250) by Philippe Mouskes
- New Prussian Chronicle by Wigand of Marburg (1326); only about 500 lines of the 17,000 original lines in rhymed Middle High German have survived
  - translated into Latin prose as Chronica nova Prutenica by Konrad von Gesselen
- Roman de Brut by Wace
- Spieghel Historiael by Jacob van Maerlant
- Sture's Chronicle
- Styrian Rhymed Chronicle
- Rhymed Chronicle of Utrecht (c. 1378)
- Rhyming Chronicle of Worringen

== See also ==
- Books of Chronicles
- Medieval Chronicle Society
