= Kieldrecht =

- Village
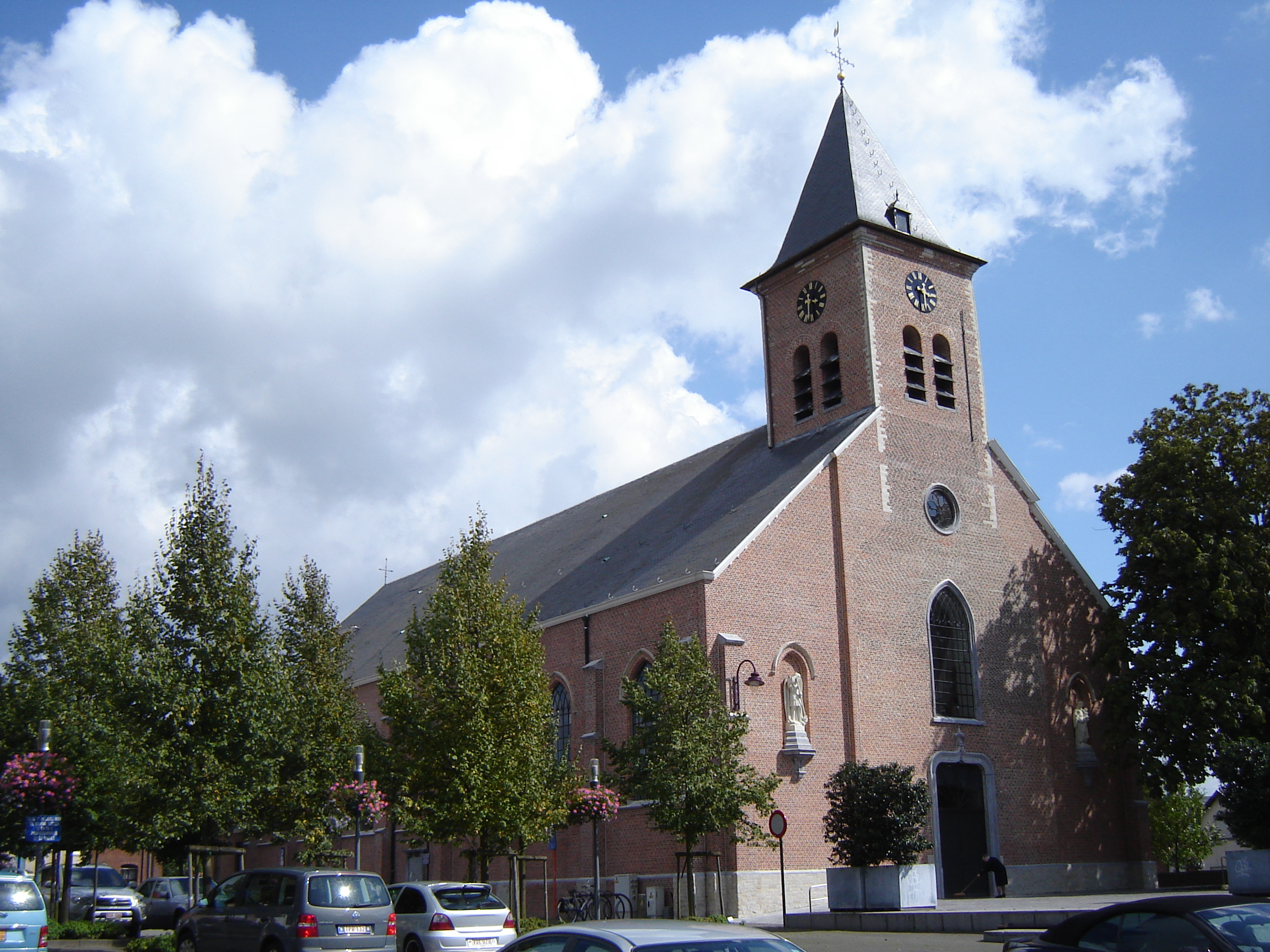
- St Michaels Church

- Seal

- Location in Belgium
- Coordinates: 51.2905°N 4.1722°E
- Country: Belgium
- Region: Flemish Region
- Province: East Flanders
- Municipality: Beveren

Area
  - Total: 19.96 km^{2} (7.71 sq mi)

Population (2021)
  - Total: 4,032
  - Density: 202.0/km^{2} (523.2/sq mi)
- Time zone: CET

Kieldrecht is a village and deelgemeente (sub-municipality) of Beveren in East Flanders, Belgium. Kieldrecht was an independent municipality until 1977, when it merged with Beveren as part of the fusion of municipalities in Belgium. The village is located on the border with the Netherlands, and forms a single urban area with the Dutch village of Nieuw-Namen.

== History ==
Kieldrecht probably originates from the 10th century. In 1156, the priory of Hulsterloo was established which became a site of pilgrimage. It was destroyed in the 16th century during the Reformation. Hulsterloo is mentioned in the poem Van den vos Reynaerde (c. 1250) which is set in the area.

Kieldrecht used to be a dike village whose economy was based on fishing. The land around Kieldrecht was often flooded. In 1805, new dikes were built around the Saaftingepolder, and the area was no longer affected by spring tides. As a border area, it often suffered from wars, and contains few historic buildings. Like neighbouring Doel, a large part of the former municipality has become an industrial zone and is now part of the Port of Antwerp.

The municipality of Kieldrecht was home to 4,083 people in 1974, and covered an area of 19.48 square kilometres (7.52 sq mi). In 1977, Kieldrecht was merged into Beveren and became a deelgemeente.

== Sights ==
The St Michaels Church was first mentioned in 1238. During the Eighty Years' War it was used as a sconce by the Dutch States Army against the Spanish troops. In 1711, a new single aisled church was built, and in 1788, a new tower was added. In 1854, the church was extensively modified into the current three aisled church.

== Nature ==
The Grote Geule is a nature area near Kieldrecht. It is a complex of creeks which developed after the land was flooded. It contains slightly brackish water. The nature area attracts birds like the western marsh harrier and bluethroat, and is an important winter area for geese and ducks. The Grote Geule is protected since 2003 and measures 22 hectares (54 acres).

== Notable people ==
- Theo Middelkamp (1914–2005), road cyclist and former world champion. Born in Nieuw-Namen, but lived in Kieldrecht for most of his life.
- Frans Pauwels (1918–2001), racing cyclist

== Gallery ==
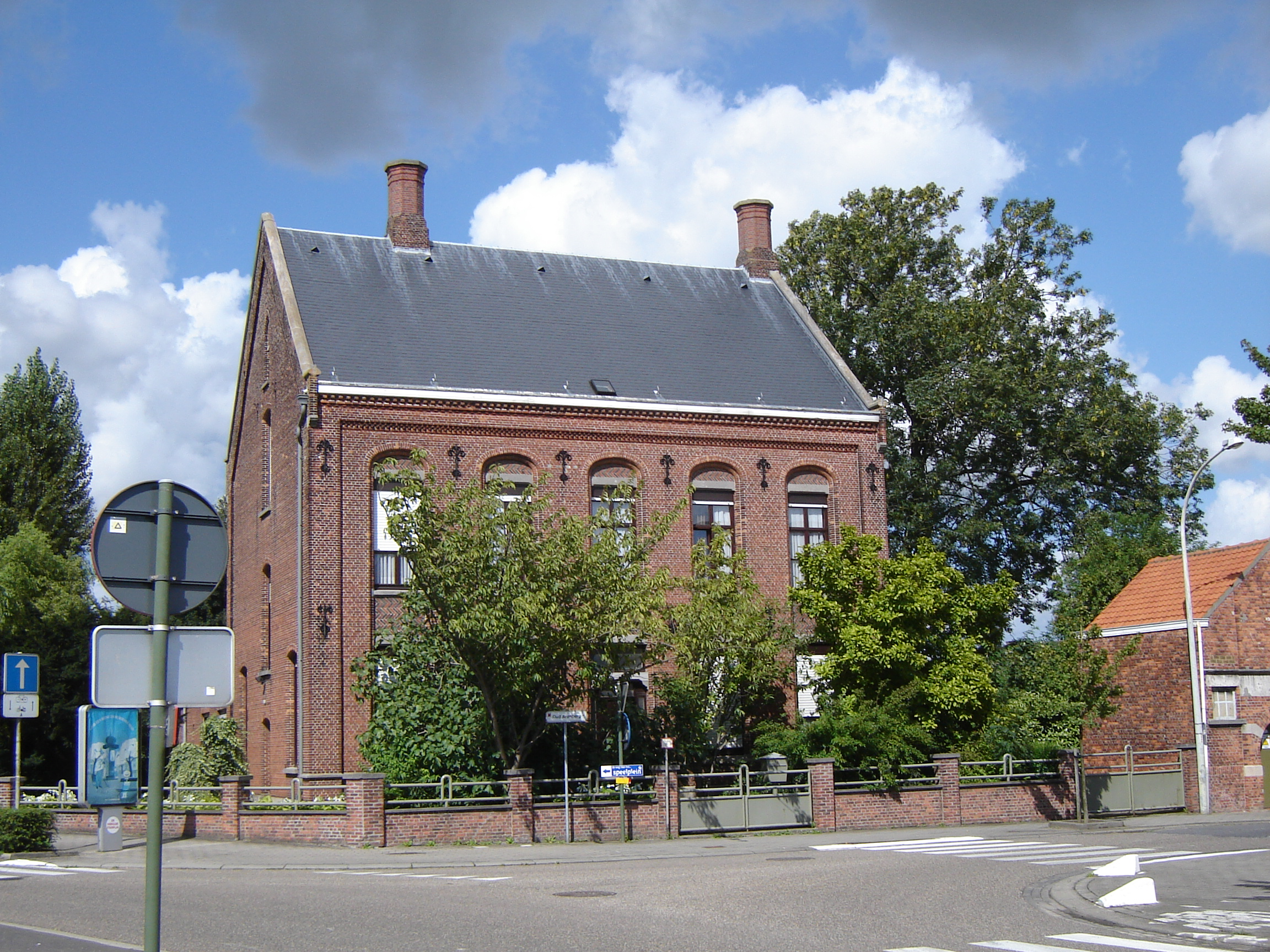
Clergy house

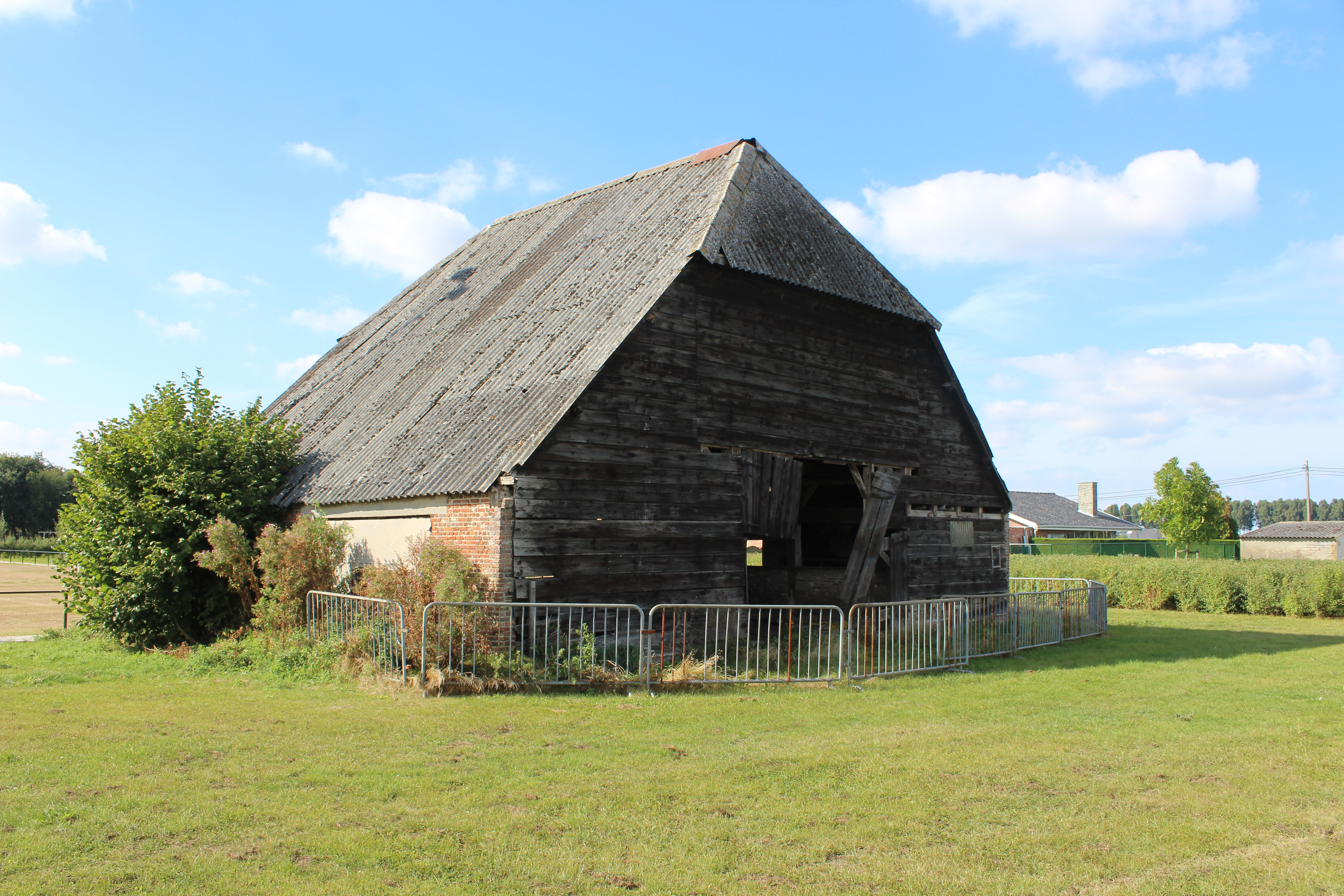
Barn Oud Arenberg

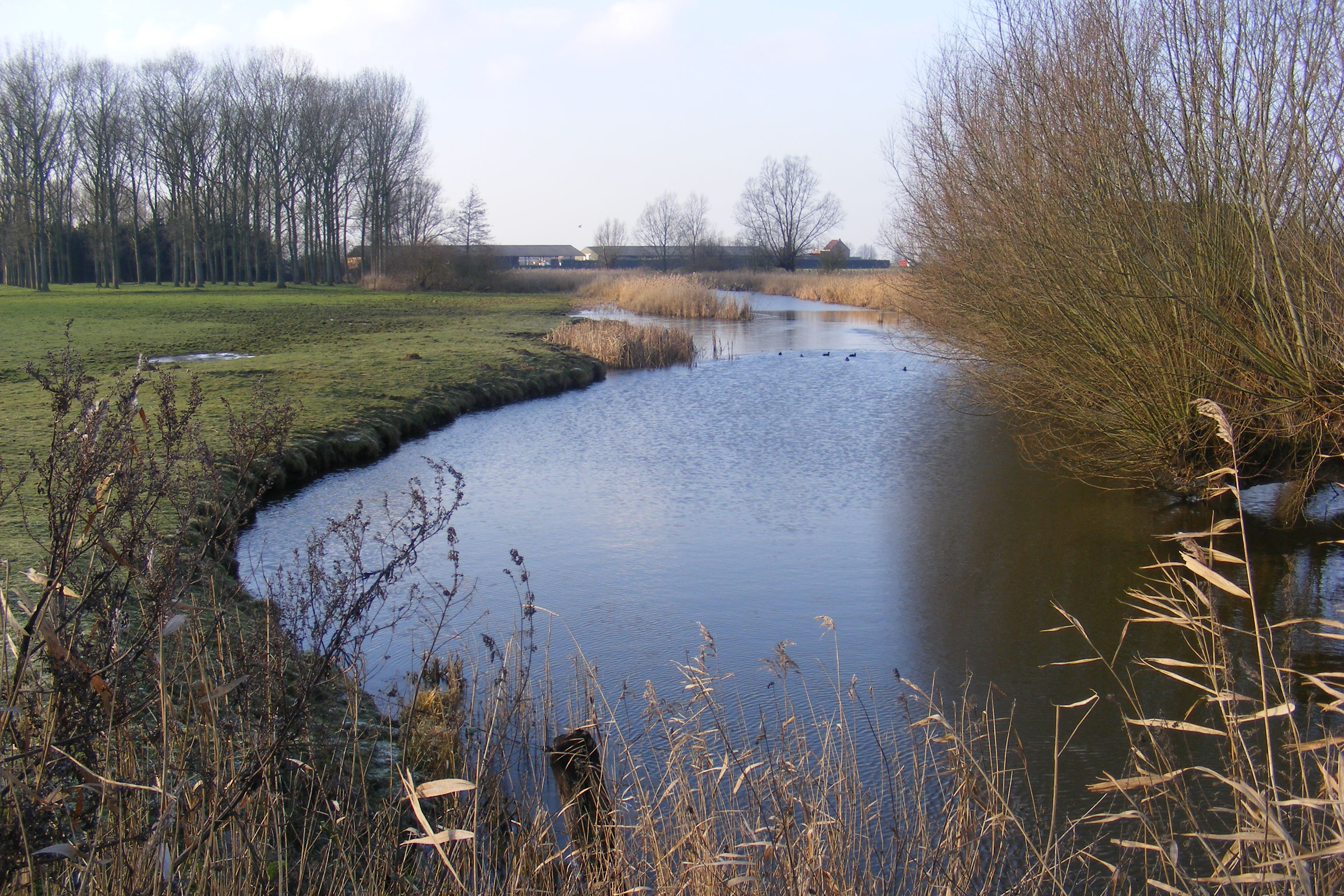
Kieldrechtse Watergang in the Grote Geule

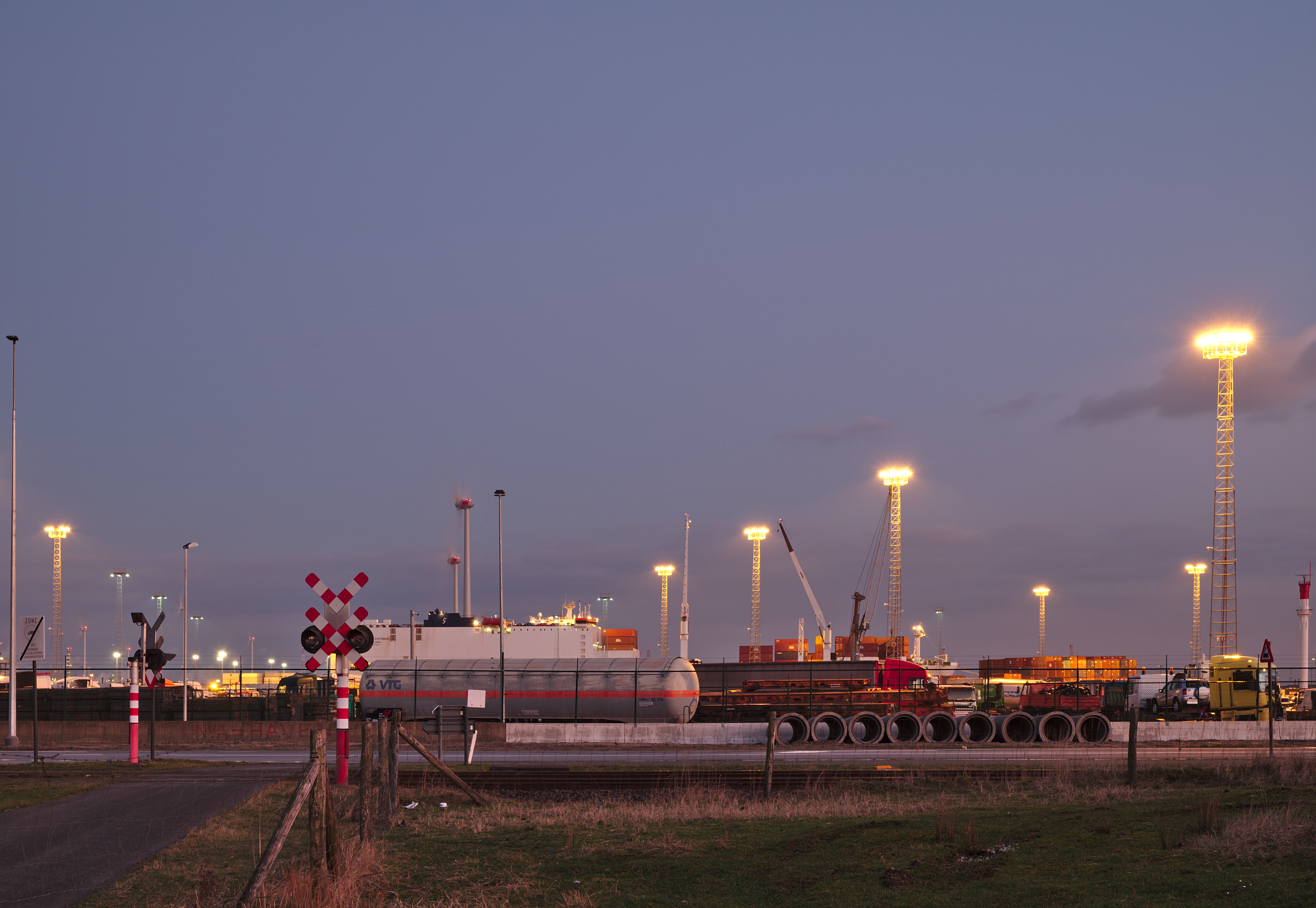
Antwerp Euroterminal
