= Lambert of Saint-Bertin =

Lambert of Saint-Bertin (c. 1060 – 22 June 1125) was a French Benedictine chronicler and abbot.

== Biography ==
Lambert was born about 1060 of a distinguished family, and, when still young, entered the French Benedictine abbey of St-Bertin. He afterwards visited several famous schools in France, having first laid the foundation of his subsequent learning by the study in his own monastery of grammar, theology and music. For some time he filled the office of prior, and in 1095 was chosen abbot at once by the monks of St-Bertin and by the canons of St-Omer. He was thus drawn into closer relations with Cluny, and instituted through the Cluniac monks many reforms in his somewhat deteriorated monastery. Needless to say, he encountered no little opposition to his efforts, but, thanks to his extraordinary energy, he finally secured acceptance for his views, and rehabilitated the financial position of the monastery. He was a friend of St. Anselm and exchanged verses, still extant, with the poet Reginald of Canterbury (ed. Libermann in "Neues Archiv der Gesellschaft fur altere Geschichte", XIII, 1888, pp. 528; 531-34). He died on 22 June 1125, at St-Bertin.

== Works ==
Even during his lifetime, Lambert was lauded in glowing terms for his great learning by an admirer —not a monk of St-Bertin— in the "Tractatus de moribus Lamberti Abbatis S. Beretini" (ed. Holder-Egger in "Monumenta German. Histor. SS.", XV, 2, 946-53). This work mentions several otherwise unknown writings of Lambert, e.g. "Sermones de Vetere Testamento", also studies on free will, the Divine prescience, original sin, origin of the soul and questions of physical science.

Although the two are often confused, he is not identical with Lambert, the Canon of St. Omer who wrote the famous "Liber Floridus", a kind of encyclopedia of Biblical, chronological, astronomical, geographical, theological, philosophical and natural history subjects, which was completed in 1120.

== Sources and references ==
The entry cites:

- August Potthast, Bibliotheca historica medii aevi I, 705; Biogr. Nat. De Belgigue, XI (1891), 162-66
- Wilhelm Wattenbach, Geschichtsquellen, II (1894), 170 sq.
