= Genealogia comitum Flandrensium =

The Genealogia comitum Flandrensium, also called the Genealogia Bertiniana, is a short text containing a genealogy of the counts of Flanders. It exists today in three versions, all based on an archetype produced probably at Saint Peter's Abbey in Ghent shortly after the death of Count Baldwin V in 1067. The three versions are all identical up to the 1067, thereafter they diverge. The first version, 204 words in length, continues the genealogy to the death of Robert II (1111); the second, 243 words, to that of Baldwin VII (1119); and the third, 337 words, to that of Theoderic (1168). The complete, 337-word text with variants was edited by Ludwig Bethmann and published in the Monumenta Germaniae Historica (Scriptores, IX, 305–7). It was published under the title Genealogia comitum Flandriae Bertiniana because Bethmann mistakenly believed it to originate in the Abbey of Saint-Bertin.

The Genealogia had a wide circulation in Flanders. It also circulated in northern Germany, where a Middle Low German translation was included in some manuscripts of the Sächsische Weltchronik, and it was known at the monasteries of Notre-Dame-du-Bec in Normandy and Cîteaux in Burgundy. It was a very influential text in Flanders. The canon Lambert of Saint-Omer used the Genealogia as a source for the genealogy in his Liber floridus, which was in turn a source for the Flandria generosa.

The Genealogia is the earliest source for the so-called "Foresters of Flanders" (Forestiers de Flandre), the legendary three foresters—Liederik of Harelbeke, Ingelram and Audacer—who were the first counts of Flanders and the progenitors of the later counts.

== List of manuscripts ==
The Genealogia in all its variants is found in nine manuscripts, eight from the twelfth century.

- Arras, BM, 685
- Boulogne-sur-Mer, BM, 102
- Brussels, KBR, 8675–89
- Dijon, BM, 322
- Douai, BM, 318
- Douai, BM, 319
- Leiden, UB, BPL 20
- Lincoln, Cathedral Library, 98
- London, BL, Cotton Fragments, vol. 1
