= Willem die Madoc maecte =

Willem die Madocke maecte (c. 1200 – c. 1250; "William-who-made-Madoc") is the traditional designation of the author of Van den vos Reynaerde, a Middle Dutch version of the story of Reynard the Fox.

== Name of the author ==
The name of the author derives from the first line of the poem, where he introduces himself as the same Willem who had previously written a work called Madoc:

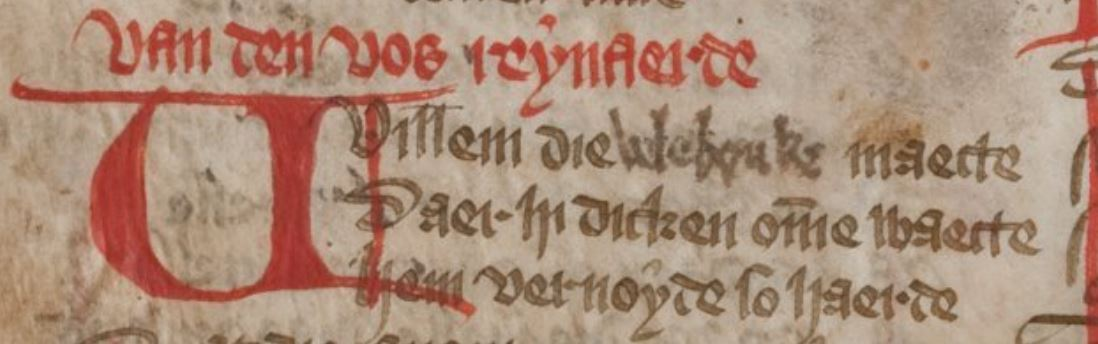
First lines of Van den vos Reynaerde from the 15th-century Comburg manuscript

Willem, die Madocke maecte,
Daer hi dicken omme waecte,
Hem vernoyde so haerde
Dat die avonture van Reynaerde
In dietsche onghemaket bleven.

(Willem, who wrote Madoc,
As he often took such care
It troubled him so much
That the adventure of Reynard
Had not been written in Dutch)

== Identification with other known medieval people ==
It has been suggested that Willem is identical to Willem of Bruges, Canon of Kortrijk Cathedral. References to localities in the poem suggest that he lived much of his life in East Flanders, including Ghent, a town he mentions twice in his work.

== Works ==
The only surviving Medieval text that can be attributed to Willem is the satirical narrative poem Van den vos Reynaerde.

=== Madoc ===
Madoc may have been an early version of the story of the legendary Welsh explorer Prince Madoc. No copies of Willem's Madoc are known to have survived, but there are references to it that suggest that the poem was widely circulated in manuscript.

=== Van den vos Reynaerde ===
Van den vos Reynaerde is a Middle Dutch poem from around 1250. It is considered a major work of Middle Dutch literature and has been called "the pinnacle of Gothic literature in the Netherlands." It became the standard version of the Reynard legend, and most subsequent versions in Dutch, German, and English were founded on it, including those of William Caxton, Goethe, and F. S. Ellis.
