= Albert Derolez =

Belgian librarian and medievalist (1934–2026)

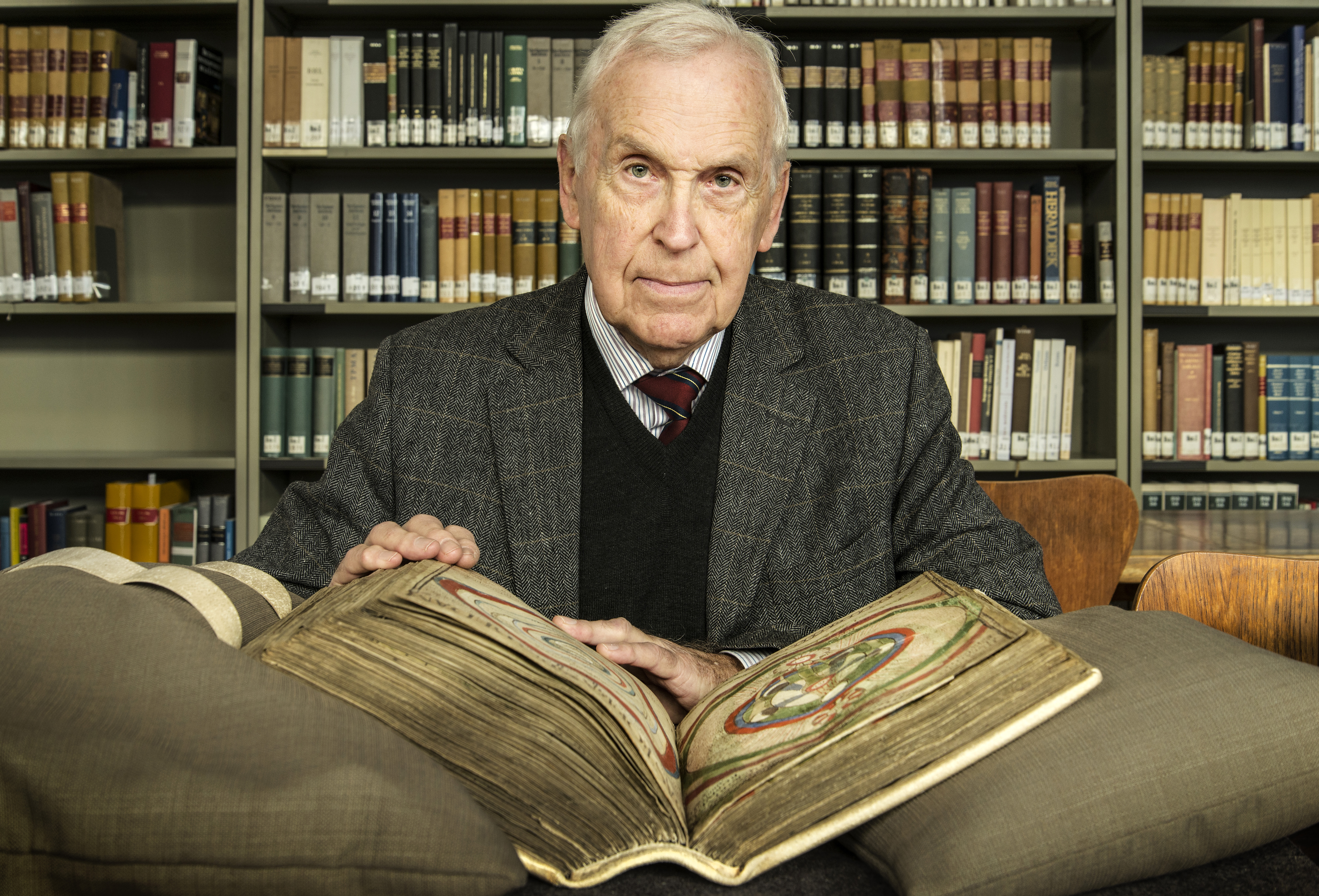
A photograph of Albert Derolez consulting the Liber Floridus in the Rare Books Reading Room of Ghent University Library, 2014

Albert Derolez (8 August 1934 – 11 July 2026) was a Belgian librarian and medievalist, particularly known as an expert on the 12th-century encyclopaedia Liber Floridus.

== Life and career ==
From 1962 Derolez was employed by Ghent University Library, where he catalogued and inventorised the medieval manuscripts. He completed a doctorate in 1970 with a thesis on the Liber Floridus, and in subsequent decades was recognised as the leading expert on that text.

While continuing to work as a librarian in Ghent, Derolez also lectured on codicology and palaeography at the Vrije Universiteit Brussel and Université Libre de Bruxelles, as well as being a guest lecturer at UC Berkeley and the Rare Book School, where he held the Kenneth and Shirley Rendell Chair in Manuscript Studies. He was a consultant on the digital cataloguing of the manuscripts in the Beinecke Library at Yale University.

In 2018 a Festschrift was published in his honour with the title Librorum studiosus: Miscellanea palaeographica et codicologica Albert Derolez dicata, edited by Lucien Reynhout and Benjamin Victor. He died on 11 July 2026, at the age of 91.

== Works ==
Derolez had over 400 publications to his name. Among them are:

- Lamberti S. Audomari Canonici Liber Floridus: Codex Autographus Bibliothecae Universitatis Gandavensis, 1968
- The Library of Raphael de Marcatellis, Abbot of St. Bavon's, Ghent, 1437-1508, 1979
- Guibert of Gembloux, Epistolae, 1988–1989
- with C. Coppens and H. Heymans, Codex Eyckensis: An Insular Gospel Book from the Abbey of Aldeneik, 1994
- The Autograph Manuscript of the Liber Floridus: A Key to the Encyclopedia of Lambert of Saint-Omer, 1998
- "The Manuscript Transmission of Hildegard of Bingen's Writings", in Hildegard of Bingen: The Context of her Thought and Art, edited by Charles Burnett and Peter Dronke, 1998
- The Palaeography of Gothic Manuscript Books from the Twelfth to the Early Sixteenth Century, 2003
- ""The Script Reform of Petrarch: An Illusion?" in Music and Medieval Manuscripts: Paleography and Performance, edited by John Haines and Randall Rosenfeld, 2006
- The Making and Meaning of the Liber Floridus: A Study of the Original Manuscript, Ghent University Library, MS 92, 2014
- with Hendrik Defoort and Frank Vanlangenhove, Medieval Manuscripts: Ghent University Library, 2017
- Liber Floridus: De oudste geïllustreerde encyclopedie, 2025
