= Liber Floridus =

Medieval encyclopedia by Lambert of St. Omer

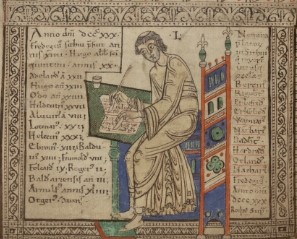
Lambert at work. Excerpt from the manuscript "Liber Floridus". Preserved in the Ghent University Library.

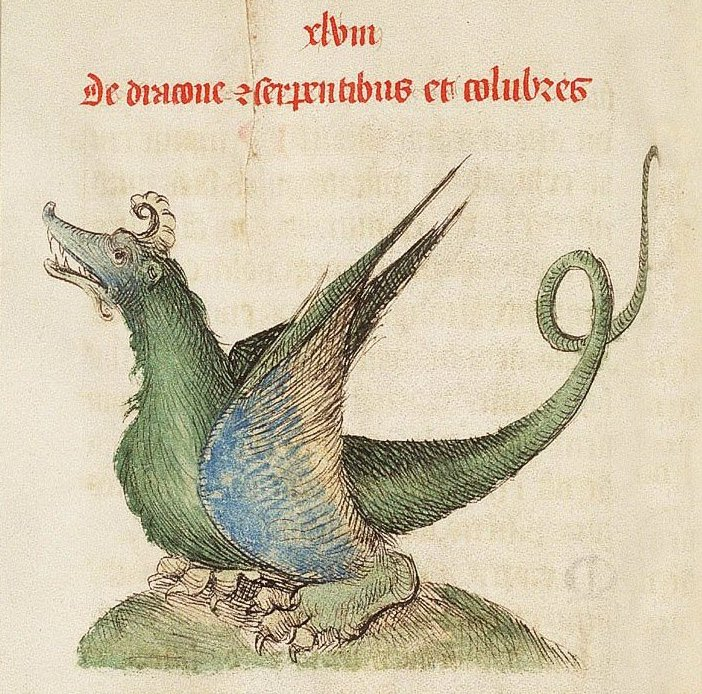
Lambert, Canon of St. Omer, Liber Floridus (Lille and Ninove, 1460)

Liber Floridus ("Book of Flowers") is a medieval encyclopedia that was compiled between 1090 and 1120 by Lambert, Canon of Saint-Omer. The text compiles extracts from some 192 or so different works.

Lambert's medieval encyclopedia contains a universal history, a chronological record of events to the year 1119. These are of Biblical, astronomical, geographical, philosophical and natural history subjects. Lambert wrote Liber Floridus originally in Latin, and later it was translated into French as Le Livre fleurissant en fleurs. A detailed description is in the Historia comitum Normannorum, comitum Flandriae.

The Liber Floridus was the first of the encyclopedias of the High Middle Ages that slowly superseded the work of Isidore of Seville. The original manuscript, completed in 1120 and dedicated to Saint Omer by Lambert, has been preserved in the Ghent University Library, though its latter portion has not survived. A copy is in the Bibliothèque Nationale, Paris. There is also a copy in the Herzog August Bibliothek, Wolfenbüttel, Germany. There may be as many as six additional extant manuscript copies, dating from the twelfth to the sixteenth centuries and produced in France or Flanders. Liber Floridus has the reputation of being one of the most famous encyclopedias of the Middle Ages.

Liber Floridus includes various maps including a mappa mundi. The Ghent manuscript, being the oldest of the known copies and dating from earlier than 1125, includes a map of parts of Europe and two climate-zone drawings based on the Macrobian model as an attempt to make a complete world map. The parts of the European map sketch show interesting and odd representations. This manuscript and the associated maps are believed to have been done personally by Lambert.

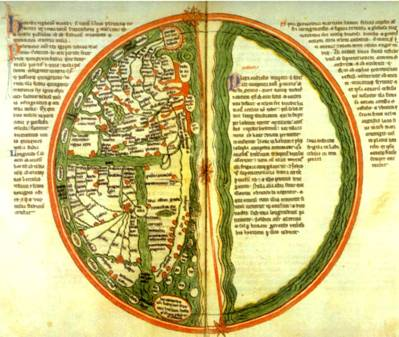
World map of 12th century

The Wolfenbüttel and Paris copies with their European "mappa mundi" date from somewhere around 1150. Historians do not believe these were done by Lambert. R. Uhden points out that the world map in the Wolfenbüttel copy has a legend saying the original source was from Martianus Capella (fl. 410 - 439). This reference has been backed up by information found in various other inscriptions on the map that are passages from Martianus' Satyricon, also known as De Nuptiis Philologiae et Mercurii.

Lambert collected his material from such sources as Isidore's Etymologiae, the Historia Brittonum, and the crusade chronicle of Bartolf of Nangis. Lambert frequently mentions crusaders from Saint-Omer and elsewhere, whom he presumably met when they returned home. In 1968 Albert Derolez published a copy of the Ghent manuscript, with historical and palaeographical introductions. It included a number of photographs of the original manuscript pages.

The Liber has sometimes been incorrectly attributed to Lambert of St-Bertin, a monk at the Abbey of Saint Bertin. The compiler of the Liber was a canon at the nearby church of Our Lady of Saint-Omer. His father, Onulfus, had also been a canon at the same church.

Page examples

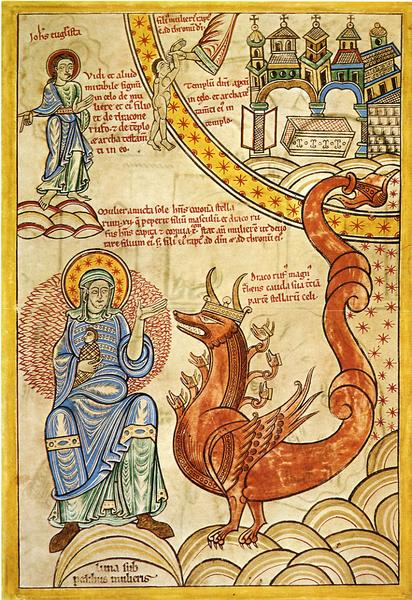
Depicted: The Beast, Apocalypse

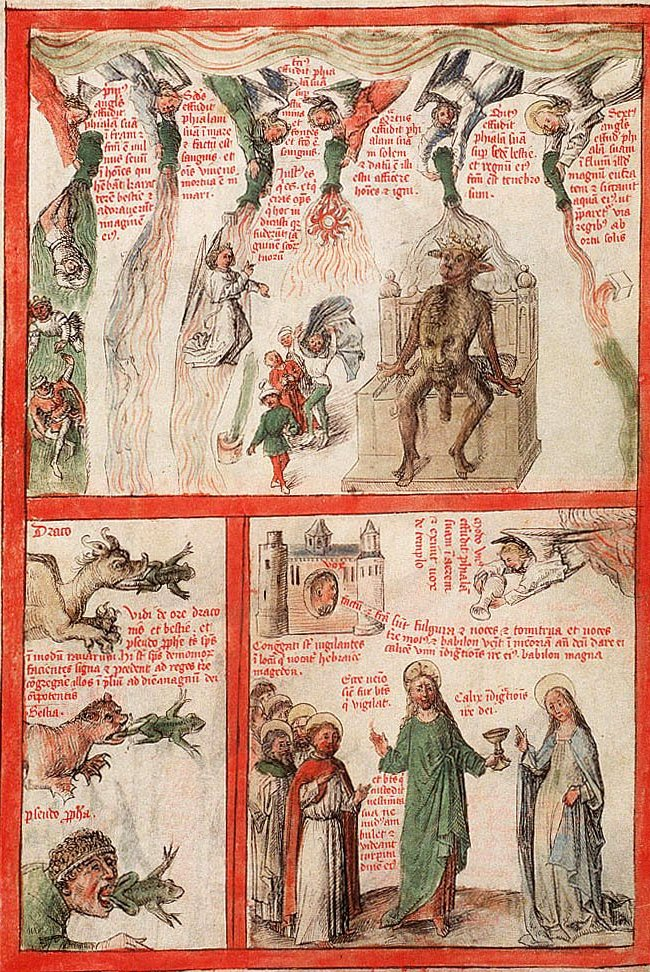
Page scan B, three unclean spirits, a beast and a false prophet

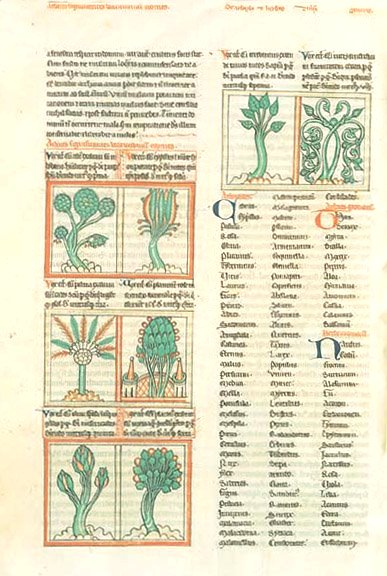
Page scan C, "Plants and Flowers"

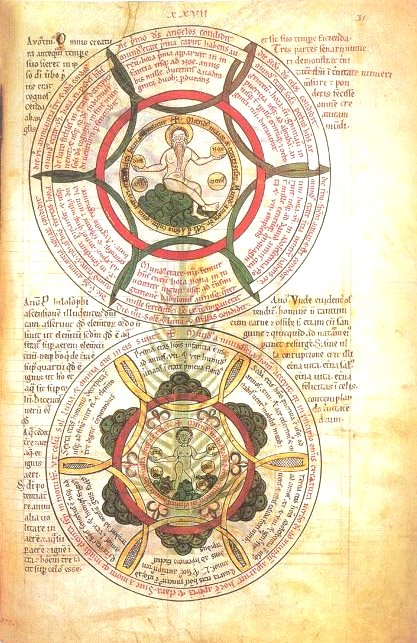
Liber Floridus explains how the world will end.

== See also ==
- Genealogia comitum Flandrensium

== Sources ==
- Herbermann, Charles George, The Catholic Encyclopedia: An International Work of Reference on the Constitution, Doctrine, Discipline, and History of the Catholic Church, Encyclopedia Press, 1913
