= Van den vos Reynaerde =

Middle Dutch version of the story of Reynard the Fox

Van den vos Reinaerde
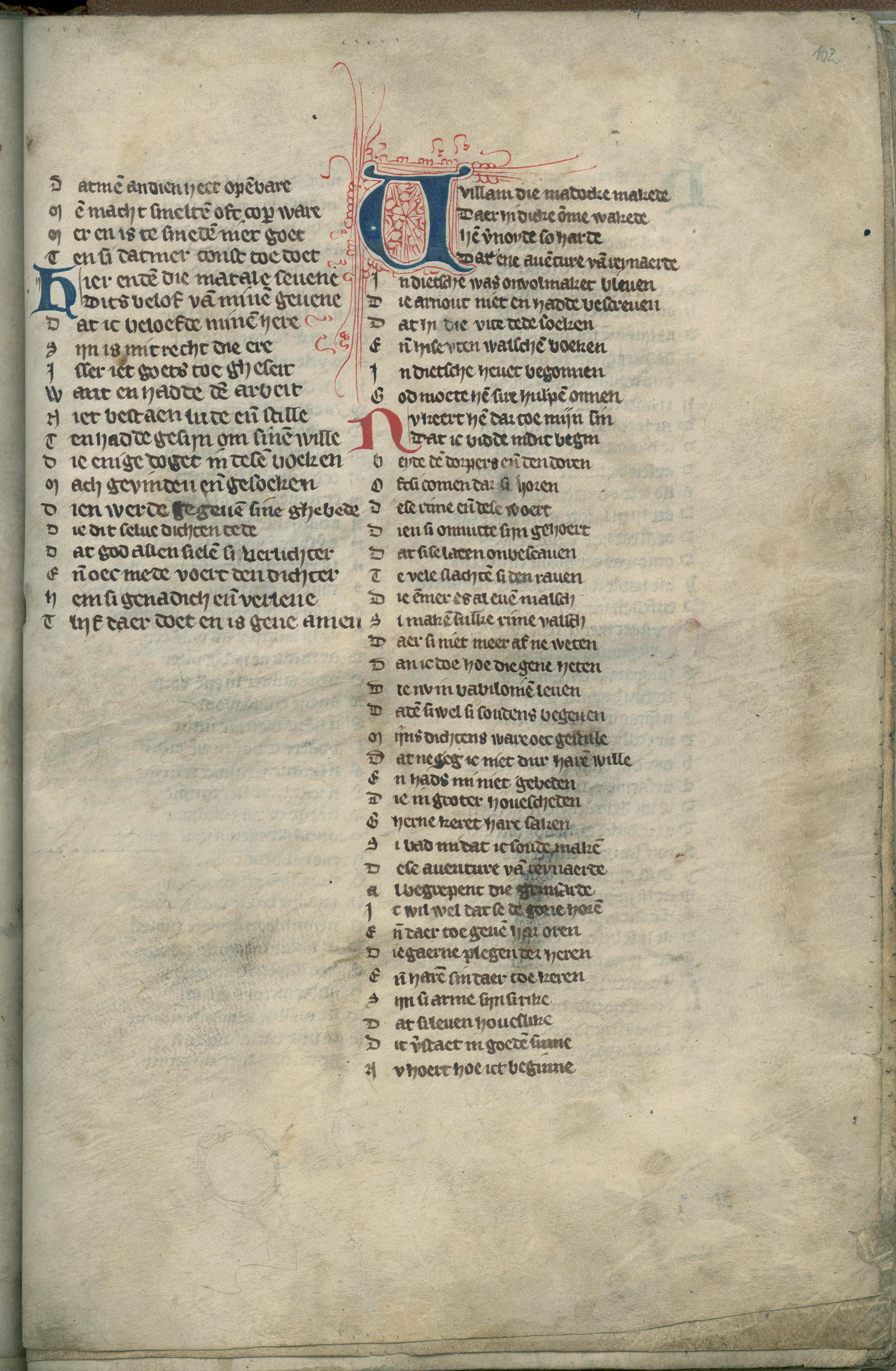
- First lines of Van den vos Reynaerde in the 14th-century Dyckse manuscript
- Author(s): Willem die Madoc maecte
- Language: Middle Dutch
- Date: c. 1250
- Series: Reynard the Fox
- Manuscript(s): Comburgse manuscript Dyckse manuscript

Van den vos Reinaerde (English title: Of Reynaert the Fox) is the Middle Dutch version of the story of Reynard the Fox, as written by Willem die Madoc maecte. The poem dates from around 1250. It is considered a major work of Middle Dutch literature and has been called "the pinnacle of Gothic literature in the Netherlands."

== Sources ==
Willem was reliant for the story of Van den vos Reinaerde on the French epic poem Le Plaid, the first story of a larger collection of fox tales known as the Roman de Renard - written by Perrout de Saint Cloude in 1160. He freely adapted and developed the original source, doing so "so deftly and with so much freedom and originality that his adaptation is universally conceded to be the best specimen of the genre in any language."

== Content ==
Satire about a fox who kills and bullies, and gets away with his deeds. The rest of society isn't much better. The nobility is being portrayed as lazy and often stupid. Clergymen are sexually active. The common population is often violent and cruel. Many women are sexually promiscuous and include prostitutes.

== Meaning ==
André De Vries writes that the work is an allegory of contemporary netherlandish politics at the court of Philip I of Namur, known as "Philip the Noble":

It is supposed that Willem wrote Van den Vos Reinaerde to encourage Siger III, chatelain of the Counts’ Castle in Ghent, who was unjustly deprived of his post around 1210 by Philip the Noble, Count of Namur and Regent of Flanders. The figure of the concupiscent and vacillating Noble the Lion seems to be based on Philip, who slavishly followed the King of France’s orders and handed over two princesses as hostages to his master. Reinaert’s castle is actually Siger III’s country retreat at Destelbergen, which appears on later maps by the same name as Reinaert’s lair, Malpertuus, meaning Hell’s Gate.

De Vries argues that the animal characters represent barons who conspired against the Count of Flanders. He is accused of various crimes, but generally outwits his accusers. Nevertheless, he is in the end sent into exile.

== Popularity ==
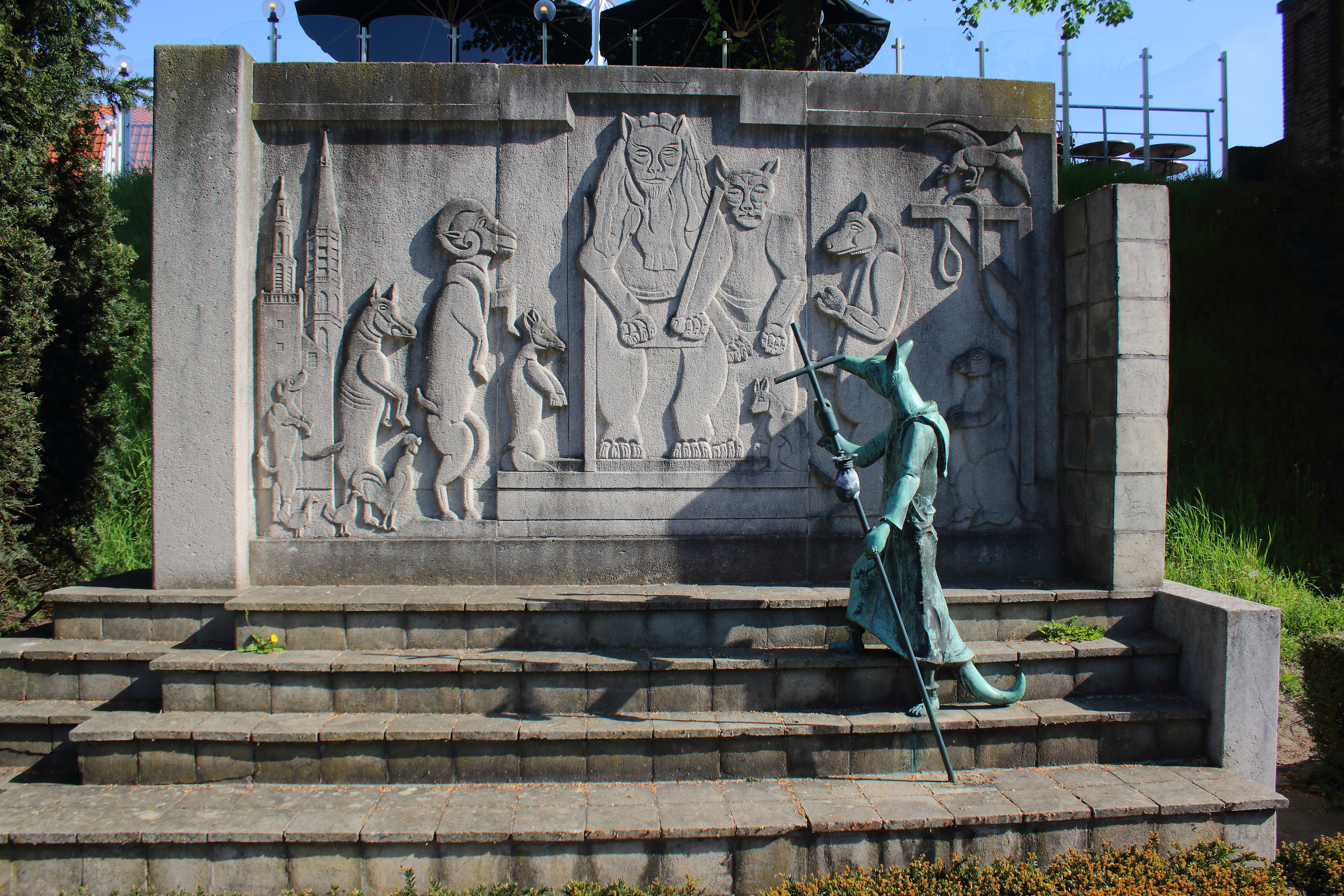
Monument of Reynaert the Fox in Hulst, Netherlands

Willem's Reynard was translated into Latin verse by a contemporary. Another unknown poet wrote a sequel, expanding the original to a full eight thousand line version. This version, when printed in 1487, proved very popular across Europe. It was the foundation for most later Dutch, German, and English versions, including those of William Caxton, Goethe, and F. S. Ellis.
