= Blood is thicker than water =

Proverb

Blood is thicker than water is a proverb in English meaning that familial bonds will always be stronger than other relationships. The oldest record of this saying can be traced back to the 12th century in German.

== Historical perspectives ==
A similar proverb in German first appeared in a different form in the medieval German beast epic Reinhart Fuchs (c. 1180; English: Reynard the Fox) by Heinrich der Glîchezære. The 13th-century Heidelberg manuscript reads in part, "ouch hoer ich sagen, das sippe blůt von wazzere niht verdirbet". In English it reads, "I also hear it said that kin-blood is not spoiled by water." Jacob Grimm suggests that this saying, which is not read anywhere else, means that the bonds of family blood are not erased by the waters of baptism, and so the raven Diezelin will have inherited his father's outlook despite having been christened.

In 1412, the English priest John Lydgate observed in Troy Book, "For naturelly blod wil ay of kynde / Draw unto blod, wher he may it fynde."

William Jenkyn referenced the proverb in its modern form in a 1652 sermon: "Blood is thicker (we say) then [sic] water; and truly the blood of Christ beautifying any of our friends and children, should make us prefer them before those, between whom and us there’s only a watery relation of nature."

The proverb appears frequently in the literary works of eighteenth- and nineteenth-century Scottish authors. In John Moore's Zeluco (1789), a character assures another in a letter that there is little danger in his forgetting his old friends "and far less my blood relations; for surely blood is thicker than water." In Christian Isobel Johnstone’s Scottish romance, Clan-Albin: A National Tale (1815), the character Flora is considered "of mixed blood at best," but a distant relative observes that “blood is thicker than water… and all the water in the Monzievar could not wash our blood from hers." The phrase or some variation appears several times in Sir Walter Scott's work, including Marmion (1808), Rob Roy (1817), and Guy Mannering (1815): "Wheel — Blud's [sic] thicker than water — she's welcome to the cheeses." The proverb appears in English reformer Thomas Hughes's Tom Brown's School Days (1857).

The phrase was first attested in the United States in the Journal of Athabasca Department (1821). On June 25, 1859, U.S. Navy Commodore Josiah Tattnall III, in command of the U.S. Squadron in Far Eastern waters, made this adage a part of U.S. history when explaining why he had given aid to the British squadron in an attack on Taku Forts at the mouth of the Hai River, thereby abandoning the strict American policy of neutrality that had been adopted in the Second Opium War after the Battle of the Barrier Forts.

== Other interpretations ==
The use of the word blood to refer to kin or familial relations has roots dating back to Greek and Roman traditions. This usage of the term was seen in the English-speaking world from the late 1300s.

In eighteenth- and nineteenth-century uses of the proverb, blood could be a metaphor for national or clan affiliations rather than biological kinship. For instance, in Clan-Albin, the characters are debating whether the small and soft Flora has pure enough clan ties to marry into the Craig-gillian family, who prefer "Amazonian daughters". The notion of a "national" affiliation could also be interpreted quite broadly as in the Tattnall example above, in which an American commodore came to the aid of the British Navy. A nineteenth-century British contributor to Notes and Queries determined that Americans were still bound to Britain by "education and descent": "The thrill of grief and indignation with which the news of President Garfield's assassination was received in England, and the sympathy which his long agony called forth, could have been awakened by no alien. 'Blood is thicker than water,' and the frequently heard remark, 'He is not a foreigner, he is an American,' shows that this is generally acknowledged."

H.C. Trumbull contrasts the expression with a comparison of blood and milk in the Arab world:

We, in the West, are accustomed to say that "blood is thicker than water"; but the Arabs have the idea that blood is thicker than milk, than a mother's milk. With them, any two children nourished at the same breast are called "milk-brothers," or "sucking brothers"; and the tie between such is very strong. […] But the Arabs hold that brothers in the covenant of blood are closer than brothers at a common breast; that those who have tasted each other's blood are in a surer covenant than those who have tasted the same milk together; that "blood-lickers," as the blood-brothers are sometimes called, are more truly one than "milk-brothers," or "sucking brothers"; that, indeed, blood is thicker than milk, as well as thicker than water.

Aldous Huxley's Ninth Philosopher's Song (1920) approached the proverb differently, stating, "Blood, as all men know, than water's thicker / But water's wider, thank the Lord, than blood."

Writing in the 1990s and 2000s, author Albert Jack and Messianic minister Richard Pustelniak claimed that the original meaning of the expression was that the ties between people who have made a blood covenant (or have shed blood together in battle) were stronger than ties formed by "the water of the womb", thus "The blood of the covenant is thicker than the water of the womb". Neither of the authors cites any sources to support their claims.

== See also ==
- Blood viscosity
- List of English-language idioms
- Loyalty
  - Appeal to loyalty
- Kin selection
