= Ecbasis captivi =

The Ecbasis captivi (full title: Ecbasis cuiusdam captivi per tropologiam, "The escape of a certain captive, interpreted figuratively") is an anonymous Latin beast fable that probably dates to the middle of the 11th century, and was likely written in the Vosges region of France. It is the oldest example of a European beast fable to survive, and the first medieval European example of anthropomorphic animals. The poem is written in hexameters with Leonine internal rhyme frequently used throughout the poem. The text survives in two manuscripts, both of which now are at the Royal Library of Belgium.

== Synopsis ==
The plot of the poem revolves around a fable within a fable. A calf has been caught by a wolf on Easter. The wolf has a dream, warning him not to eat the calf. Meanwhile, the other animals come to the wolf's cave.

The inner fable is told, which explains why the wolf and fox are enemies. The lion, king of beasts, was sick. All the animals suggest cures for the lion except for the fox. The wolf suggests that the fox should be hanged for his failure to appear and offer a cure. A panther warns the fox to present himself and make a defense; the fox appears and explains that he was on a pilgrimage. He offers his cure: flay the wolf and let the lion use his skin as a blanket. This was done, and the cure worked. The lion recovers; courtiers sing songs comparing the lion's suffering to the passion of Jesus Christ, and the fox supplants the wolf as regent.

Then, the wolf shows himself to the assembled crowd of animals, which allows the calf to escape. The wolf is gored by the steer, and the fox writes him an epitaph.

== Interpretations ==
Adolf Ebert has written that the poem is unique, not only because it is the first new beast fable to appear in the European Middle Ages, but also because it unites the classical tradition of anthropomorphic fables such as Aesop with the allegorizing Christian bestiary tradition exemplified in the Physiologus and similar popular works. The story of the cure of the lion has parallels in Aesop. On the one hand, the wolf of the story is a representation of Satan; on the other hand is apparently meant to represent the monks, who were often depicted as notoriously greedy in period literature.

== See also ==
- Ysengrimus
- Reynard cycle
