= Gunnerkrigg Court =

Science-fantasy webcomic started in 2005

- The front cover of Gunnerkrigg Court: Orientation
- Author: Tom Siddell
- Website: www.gunnerkrigg.com
- Current status/schedule: Updates Mondays, Wednesdays and Fridays
- Launch date: 4 April 2005
- Genre(s): Science fiction, fantasy

Gunnerkrigg Court is a science-fantasy webcomic created by Tom Siddell and launched in April 2005. It is updated online three days a week, and eight volumes of the still continuing comic have been published in print format by Archaia Studios Press and Titan Books (in the United Kingdom and Ireland). The comic has been critically acclaimed and has won numerous Web Cartoonists' Choice Awards, as well as receiving positive reviews for its artwork and storytelling.

The comic tells the story of Antimony Carver, a young girl who has just started attending a school at a strange and mysterious place called Gunnerkrigg Court, and the events that unfold around her as she becomes embroiled in political intrigues between Gunnerkrigg Court and the inhabitants of the Gillitie Wood, a forest outside the school. The comic's style and themes include elements from science, fantasy creatures, mythology from a variety of traditions, and alchemical symbols and theories; the literary style is heavily influenced by mystery fiction and manga.

== Production ==
Gunnerkrigg Court was first posted online on 4 April 2005, and was originally updated two days per week. The comic began updating three days per week on 25 December 2006. The end of the seventh chapter in May 2006 marked the end of the "first book," (Note: See the author's comment on Chapter 7, Page 23, in which he identifies that chapter at the end of the first book. Bonus Page 7, the last page in that chapter, was posted on 22 May 2006.) which Siddell published through Lulu.com in 2007; that book is no longer in print. In August 2008, Tom Siddell explained that the comic had a standard "comic book format" which was useful when he had sufficient pages to print a hard copy. The first fourteen chapters of the webcomic were printed as the first Archaia Studios Press edition of 296 pages bound in a hardcover collection titled "Orientation". In 2012 Siddell announced that he had quit his regular job to work on the comic full-time. In addition to books and merchandising the comic is supported through crowdfunding via Patreon since July 2014.

In November 2021, Siddell announced that "Boom/Archaia will no longer be printing the Gunnerkrigg Court collections" and was looking for a publisher for volume 9+. (As of September 2023, Vol. 9 and the softcover of Vol. 8 are still unannounced.) In October 2023, Siddell announced that "Gunnerkrigg Court is back in print", with Dark Horse Comics printing the comic "brand new with new artwork right from the beginning". On his Patreon page, Siddell explained that "the changes I'm making are really minor and will not change the look of the comic. It's just a few lines here and there that I felt brought things closer to what I thought I was doing at the time."

In May 2024, it was announced Dark Horse Comics will be publishing a limited-edition 1,000-copy hardcover edition of volume 1 in November.

=== Format ===
The Gunnerkrigg Court webcomic is told in a series of episodic chapters such that each, while forming part of the overall storyline, also functions individually as a stand-alone story arc. The themes and topics of the chapters vary widely: as one reviewer describes, "You are also not subjected to 400-plus pages of intricate plot movement. While there is an overall story arc, there are also lighter chapters that focus on unusual classes ... or small moments that build the main characters." Each chapter begins with a title page and ends with one or more "bonus pages," which are not integral to the main storyline but often offer ancillary details about the world of Gunnerkrigg Court or about minor characters. The chapters have varied in length from one page to more than eighty. Each page is drawn in traditional (A4; 210 × 297 mm) page format and divided arbitrarily into frames. (Note: See, for example, Chapter 19, Page 14 and Chapter 6, Page 5 for examples of different styles.) At the bottom of the most recent page is a link to a comments thread for that page, in which readers may comment on and discuss that day's comic.

=== Influences ===
Siddell has stated that he enjoyed reading Alfred Hitchcock & The Three Investigators as a child, and that it has heavily influenced the literary style of his comic. His artistic style is influenced by many artists, among which he cites as his favorites Jamie Hewlett, Yukito Kishiro, and Mike Mignola, as well as the manga Nausicaä of the Valley of the Wind and Dragon Ball.

One notable feature of the comic is the blending of mythological elements from many different cultural traditions, especially from the British Isles and Native American mythology. (Note: The comic contains characters such as the Black Dog and the Mallt-y-Nos of Welsh mythology, for example, as well as Muut (from Cahuilla) and Coyote (a legend shared by many Native American cultures). There are also characters based on Old French folklore, such as Reynard and Ysengrin.) Siddell attributes this style to his experience as a child: "I moved about a lot when I was younger and had the opportunity to grow up hearing stories from different parts of the world and I've always been fascinated by them." In addition to mythology, Siddell makes heavy use of alchemical themes; for example, the main character is named Antimony, after a toxic chemical element, and many pages feature artistic depictions of alchemical symbols. (Note: See, for example, Chapter 5, Page 12.) The symbol for antimony appears frequently in Gunnerkrigg Court: the character Antimony wears a necklace shaped like that symbol, the character Reynardine has the symbol imprinted on his wolf body, and the symbol is used to mark the end of a chapter.

The artwork of Gunnerkrigg Court has been described as "stylized," with simple character designs. At least one reviewer, on the other hand, has noticed that the backgrounds, in contrast to the characters, are often very elaborate. The comic has also been described as having a "rich" look in spite of its limited color palette, and Siddell himself has stated that he first developed the idea for the comic using only a limited number of colors. The pieces of artwork that Siddell has posted at the end of each printed book, entitled Treatise(s), demonstrate many such of Siddell's artistic and storytelling motifs: they integrate alchemical symbols, mythological figures, nature, and technology.

== Synopsis ==
"Second Treatise," an image by Tom Siddell that shows the characters Antimony (r.) and Kat (l.) and exemplifies Siddell's artistic styles and narrative motifs.

=== Setting ===
Gunnerkrigg Court is set somewhere in the United Kingdom or a country that resembles it. The titular institution functions as a boarding school, but also occupies a vast area, some of it seemingly uninhabited, some used as industrial or research facilities, and some occupied by students and staff. The Annan Waters separate the Court from Gillitie Wood, which is inhabited by "etheric" or magical creatures. (Note: Siddell, Tom (3 March 2008). "Chapter 17, Page 11". Gunnerkrigg Court. Jones: "There was a great division which saw the Court and the Wood separated. Nature on one side. Technology on the other.") (Note: Siddell, Tom (3 December 2008). "Chapter 20, Page 17". Gunnerkrigg Court. Coyote: "With my mighty paw I scored the earth and so the court and the forest were divided!") Chief among them are Coyote and Ysengrin, along with populations of forest animals, elves, fairies, and others. At the time the story begins, both sides enforce a kind of truce and strict separation between the Court and Forest, (Note: Siddell, Tom (4 April 2007). "Chapter 12, Page 25". Gunnerkrigg Court. Reynardine: "The people of the forest will be wanting answers! They detest all forms of technology. Why do you think there is such a divide between the Court and that damned place?!") (Note: Siddell, Tom (19 April 2005). "Chapter 1, Page 6". Gunnerkrigg Court. Antimony: "As I was forbidden from setting foot off school grounds, I could not walk Shadow 2 to the Gillitie Wood myself. There was only one sensible resolution to this problem. I must construct a robotic walking device which will provide you with transit across the bridge!") although there is an established tradition of some forest creatures transferring into human bodies to attend the Court, and a few Court denizens – notably an ambassador called the medium – are allowed to enter the Forest.

Many characters suspect that the Court is much more than just a school. (Note: See Chapter 8, Page 27 (Antimony: "This isn't just a school, is it?") and Chapter 19, Page 8 of Gunnerkrigg Court.) The school appears to actively recruit many talented or extraordinary students. (Note: The characters Zimmy and Gamma, for example, were approached before the opening of the main story by mysterious men who offered to take them to the school. See Siddell, Tom. Chapter 11, Page 11. Gunnerkrigg Court.) As the story progresses, it is soon revealed that the school is inhabited by a wide variety of both supernatural creatures – many of which become characters involved in the story's plot – and ultra-modern technology. One character explains that "the Court was founded on a union between technological and etheric design." Another describes it as "man's endeavor to become god." The house system described at the end of the first chapter is similar to that used by many UK schools, including the one the author attended; Siddell has even stated that the school in which Gunnerkrigg Court takes place is modeled after his own secondary school.

=== Plot ===
The main story of Gunnerkrigg Court revolves around Antimony "Annie" Carver, a student at the Court. Annie's parents, Surma and Anthony Carver, were also students there decades earlier, and Surma became the Court's medium to the Forest. Surma died after a long illness and Anthony disappeared, leaving Annie in the Court's care. Early in the comic, Annie befriends several supernatural beings, including a sentient shadow, a robot, and a ghost named Mort. Though initially not well liked by most of her fellow students, she becomes best friends with Katerina “Kat” Donlan, a classmate and robotics prodigy, and eventually also befriends older students Parley and Smitty.

Annie meets a creature called Reynardine, who tries to take over her body but, by accident, instead becomes trapped in the body of a stuffed animal she carries and becomes subject to her command. (Note: Siddell, Tom (11 April 2006). "Chapter 7, Page 11". Gunnerkrigg Court. Reynardine: "This stupid toy is hers, so now I can't do anything without her permission.") She gradually learns from various characters the history of the Forest and its connection to her own family. In the past, Coyote had granted some of his powers to Reynardine and Ysengrin: (Note: Siddell, Tom (12 December 2008). "Chapter 20, Page 21". Gunnerkrigg Court. Antimony: "Why were you looking for Renard in the first place? Why bring him here?" Coyote: "I sought to make him into a powerful being such as myself!") he had given Ysengrin "power over the trees" and Reynardine the power to take bodies. Reynardine had been in love with Surma (Note: Siddell, Tom (15 December 2008). "Chapter 20, Page 22". Gunnerkrigg Court. Coyote: "I wouldn't be surprised if he cared very deeply about you, [Antimony]! You see, Renard fell desperately in love with Surma!") and had used his power to steal a young man's body and woo Surma; the man died, however, and Reynardine was imprisoned in the Court until Annie encountered him. (Note: Siddell, Tom (17 December 2008). "Chapter 20, Page 23". Gunnerkrigg Court. Coyote: "[Reynardine] soon runs away! He steals the body of a young man and disappears into the Court, looking to woo the fiery Surma. We heard he was captured, tricked! ... and I did not see him again until last summer.") Surma was a psychopomp and the descendant of a fire spirit: she had an etheric power over fire, which is passed from mother to daughter at the cost of the mother's life.

Because of her relationship with Reynardine, Coyote, and Ysengrin, Annie is nominated to receive training as a medium, developing her etheric abilities including fire manipulation and astral projection. In the end, the position is given to Smitty instead, but Coyote designates her as the Forest's medium to the Court. She begins training under Ysengrin, who she learns is in a constant state of anger towards the Court but is partially brainwashed and kept in check by Coyote. Meanwhile, Anthony suddenly returns to the Court as a professor, and behaves coldly toward his daughter, moving her to a separate residence and making her repeat a school year. Annie later learns that the court is displeased by her closeness with the forest creatures and brought him back in an attempt to control her. Trying to control her rage at these events, she severs the link to her emotions and fire powers.

Annie and Kat investigate a powerful presence that guards the Annan Waters between the Court and the Forest. It turns out to be the ghost of a woman named Jeanne, one of the founders of the Court. Another founder named Diego created an arrow that killed Jeanne's lover and trapped her soul in the river, where she resisted attempts from the psychopomps to collect her soul and kills all who attempt to cross the river without the bridge. Annie, Kat, and several friends mount an expedition to recover the arrow and free the souls of Jeanne and her lover; they succeed, but Smitty is mortally wounded by Jeanne. Annie strikes a deal with the psychopomps in which they spare Smitty's life in exchange for her commitment to become a psychopomp in the future. As preparation, Annie and Kat help Mort finally pass into the ether.

Coyote, aware that the river can now be crossed freely, cedes his strength to Ysengrin, who is suddenly overwhelmed by rage and devours Coyote, becoming a creature named Loup. Loup destroys the Annan Waters, creates a duplicate version of Annie, and attacks the Court, which temporarily fends him off while preparing evacuation plans. Annie meets with Loup several times, while the Court attempts to capture him; Coyote appears several times during these encounters and suggests that all of Loup's actions were part of his plan, and that he will eventually return after Loup is killed by Annie.

In addition to Annie's central story, the story includes several additional plot arcs interspersed with the main story. One concerns two girls from the Court, Zimmy and Gamma, who communicate with one another telepathically. Zimmy sees hallucinations of monsters that her etheric abilities turn into reality, (Note: Siddell, Tom (12 January 2007). "Chapter 11, Page 9". Gunnerkrigg Court. Zimmy: "Stuff happens when I'm around, you see.... sometimes I see things that ain't supposed to be there. When it gets bad things start to change. Like, for real.") which she relies on Gamma to dispel. (Note: Siddell, Tom (24 September 2008). "Chapter 19, Page 19". Gunnerkrigg Court. Zimmy: "Yer gonna have ta take Gamma's place.... Gettin' ridda these guys.") Kat has her own storylines, including her romance with a fellow student named Paz, and experiments in robotics inspired by natural bodies and the highly complex robots (Note: Siddell, Tom (25 July 2008). "Chapter 18, Page 39". Gunnerkrigg Court. Kat: "These old models are so complex I can't figure them out. One thing's for sure; these things don't use servos or hydraulics or anything like that. Some kind of superfast reaction memory polymer?") created by Diego. Kat is eventually able to create full organic bodies for robots that make them capable of sensation, and a faction of robots seemingly starts a religion centered on the belief that she is an angel with the gift of giving robots life.

=== Main characters ===
Antimony Carver	The protagonist of Gunnerkrigg Court, eventually revealed to have fire elemental ancestry, she came to the school after her mother's death. Has a way with the "etheric" or magical beings that inhabit the Court and the Gillitie wood. (Note: Siddell, Tom (28 May 2008). "Chapter 17, Page 22". Gunnerkrigg Court. Jones: "You have a special empathy with etheric beings, as you saw when we met Coyote.") She is able to see and communicate with the guides, (Note: Siddell, Tom (28 September 2006). "Chapter 9, Page 8". Gunnerkrigg Court. Mort: "You mean you could see the guides just like that?") spirits that lead humans into the afterlife. (Note: Siddell, Tom (5 December 2007). "Chapter 16, Page 3". Gunnerkrigg Court. Antimony: "Kat, do you remember I told you about psychopomps? Kat: "Uh, those guys who escort dead dudes to the afterlife?") Acts as a medium between Gillitie Wood and the Court, as her mother did before her. (Note: Siddell, Tom (18 February 2008). "Chapter 17, Page 5". Gunnerkrigg Court. Antimony: "Yes... Lessons in mediation sound interesting." Jones: "Very good. We will begin today.")
Katerina "Kat" Donlan	Antimony's closest friend. Daughter of two teachers at the Court, Mr. and Mrs. Donlan. Whereas Antimony has close contacts with the supernatural, Kat is gifted in the formal sciences. The robots in the Court started to regard her as an angel and later "Creator". Kat is in a relationship with fellow student Paz.
Reynardine (Or interchangeably, Renard)	A fox spirit that can take others' bodies, referred to as a demon on behalf of the Court by Eglamore. (Note: Siddell, Tom (11 August 2008). "Chapter 3, Page 23". Gunnerkrigg Court. Eglamore: "Reynardine is never to be trusted. He is a demon that steals the bodies of his victims.") He is now trapped in the body of Antimony's doll and is subject to her command. In addition to inhabiting Antimony's doll, he may also take the form of a white wolf. He is very protective of Antimony, (Note: Siddell, Tom (6 June 2008). "Chapter 18, Page 18". Gunnerkrigg Court. Kat: "That was pretty cute how you got all defensive about Annie before.") which one character claims is because Reynardine had once been in love with Antimony's mother, which he later admits. Reynardine is a cousin and former companion of Coyote's, but has been confined to Gunnerkrigg Court because he killed and possessed a young man in the past, led by Coyote into the belief that this would win him Antimony's mother affection, which in turn made him fall in love with her acting under orders from the Court, who feared him as Coyote's successor. (Note: Siddell, Tom (25 August 2008). "Chapter 14, Page 24". Gunnerkrigg Court. Coyote: "Won't you come back to the forest with us, dearest cousin?" Reynardine: "You know how I feel about that. Besides, I broke their laws, remember. I couldn't leave even if I wanted to.") (Note: Siddell, Tom (12 December 2008). "Chapter 20, Page 21". Gunnerkrigg Court. Antimony: "But why is Reynardine being held at the Court?" Coyote: "Why, he killed that young man, of course!.") However, it is suggested in various conversations that he remains there not because of "men's laws", but actually for the bond he has formed with Annie.
Sir James "Jimmy Jims" Eglamore	The instructor for physical education classes, and protector of the Court. He shares his name with a dragonslaying knight from a Northumbrian folk song, and some characters have referred to him as a "dragon slayer", (Note: Siddell, Tom (30 August 2005). "Chapter 3, Page 11". Gunnerkrigg Court. Antimony: "Who is he?" Sivo: "The dragon slayer. The shackle from his prison binds my leg.") (Note: Siddell, Tom (10 November 2008). "Chapter 20, Page 7". Gunnerkrigg Court. Eglamore: "Formal attire. You know how it is" Antimony: "For a dragon slayer?" Eglamore: "Haha! Well, that's just an official title.") He also was in the same class at the court as Annie and Kat's parents. He made an appearance in the webcomic Sandra and Woo.
Zeta "Zimmy"	A student at the Court. Zimmy claims that she never sleeps. (Note: Siddell, Tom (8 January 2007). "Chapter 11, Page 7". Gunnerkrigg Court. Zimmy: "[Gamma] tries to stay awake as long as I do, but I don't sleep." Antimony: "You don't sleep?" Zimmy: "Never.") She frequently travels to a nightmare-like world recreated from scenes in her past, and sometimes other characters accidentally end up there as well. She has fangs and a black, smokelike substance obscuring her eyes, and rain seems to have calming effects on her, along with revealing for a short time that her eyes are red.
Gamma	Zimmy's girlfriend. Gamma is able to calm Zimmy when she is seeing things or in the dream-world, blocking the "static" (as is Antimony, to a lesser extent). (Note: Siddell, Tom (12 January 2007). "Chapter 11, Page 9". Gunnerkrigg Court. Zimmy: "Gamma helps me put things straight. It's like...turning on a radio. All she has to do is be near me an' the static gets pushed out.... Kinda works with you though. Not as good as Gamma but it helps. Noticed that when we first met.") She and Zimmy share a telepathic link. Speaks only Polish, and communicates with others by allowing Zimmy to translate for her.
Shadow 2	A second shadow that began to follow Antimony when she first came to the Court. Kat and Annie have taught him how to speak English. (Note: Siddell, Tom (12 February 2007). "Chapter 12, Page 3". Gunnerkrigg Court. Kat: "We could probably teach him English real fast.") In recent chapters Shadow 2 has become 3-dimensional, but retains all of his shape shifting abilities.
Robot	An anthropomorphic robot Antimony built. He is a model S13, with S standing for "Seraph". (Note: Siddell, Tom (18 June 2008). "Chapter 18, Page 23". Gunnerkrigg Court. Antimony: "What does the S stand for?" Robot: "Seraph, as I recall.") His original body, though simple in appearance, was of a highly complex design; he was later destroyed by Mr. Eglamore. Replacement bodies have included a robotic mouse. He is seemingly in some sort of relationship with Shadow 2. He has developed into a driving force in the robots belief that Kat is in fact an "angel."
General Ysengrin	A creature who lives in the Gillitie Wood. He is a wolf, but was given a 'suit' of roots and boughs by Coyote, covering his body up to the neck, usually in a humanoid shape, though he can alter it at will through his power over the trees of the forest. (Note: Siddell, Tom (13 August 2007). "Chapter 14, Page 23". Gunnerkrigg Court. Ysengrin: "You should admire this body Lord Coyote has gifted me with, Renard. Now the very trees of Gillitie are under my command!") He appears to leave it sometimes, for example to eat.
Coyote	A god who lives in the wood. He is also known as the Trickster, although Jones claims that he never lies ("and therein lies the danger"). Currently "dead" – he fused with Ysengrin to become Loup. However, he has been hinted to have some greater plan in mind.
Jones	The instructor in charge of training mediums. Some characters think she is romantically involved with Mr. Eglamore. (Note: Siddell, Tom (12 May 2008). "Chapter 18, Page 7". Gunnerkrigg Court. Antimony: "I think there might be something going on between him and Ms. Jones.") She is incredibly strong, sinks like a rock when she is in water and does not seem to show any emotion, leading some to believe that she was a robot despite the fact that Gunnerkrigg Court robots are anything but emotionless, and that she herself denied the theory. Coyote calls her "wandering eye" when he encounters her, and accuses her of "stealing" the name Jones, implying also that she has done this before with other names – something Jones does not deny. It was revealed she has existed since the formation of the planet.

== Reception ==
In addition to being officially recognized at the Web Cartoonists' Choice Awards, Gunnerkrigg Court has been critically acclaimed in a number of online reviews, and has a large readership and an active forum. Author Tom Siddell has been interviewed about his work numerous times, mostly by non-mainstream online magazines such as ComixTalk. Kevin Powers of the Comics Bulletin and Graphic Smash listed Gunnerkrigg Court as one of the series he "respect[s]," and ComixTalk (then called Comixpedia) listed Siddell as one of the twenty-five "People of Webcomics" in 2006.

The comic has received praise for its artwork and use of color, dark mood, slowly revealed mysteries, and pacing. Al Schroeder of ComixTalk has called Gunnerkrigg Court's setting "marvelous" and "unique," and said the comic is "delightfully fun" in spite of its moody backdrop. Along with the evolution in art style since the start of the comic, many reviewers have praised the age progression of the protagonists and their maturation with the plot, likening it to that of Harry Potter.

Some reviewers, on the other hand, have criticized its, at times, dark and sad tone as potentially being frightening for younger audiences, also noting that there can be "lots [of information] to take in at times."

In 2006, science fiction author Neil Gaiman praised Gunnerkrigg Court in his blog, which brought the comic to the attention of many more readers.

=== Awards ===
Gunnerkrigg Court has been nominated for and has won a number of Web Cartoonist's Choice Awards, shown in the table below. When the Web Cartoonists' Choice Awards were discontinued in 2008 and replaced by The Webcomic List Awards (run by The Webcomic List Community) in 2009, it won several of those as well. It was also nominated in 2006 for a Clickie award in the "International Clickie" category at Stripdagen Haarlem, a webcomics festival in the Netherlands. Gunnerkrigg Court: Orientation won a 2008 gold Book of the Year Award from ForeWord magazine in their graphic novel category. Gunnerkrigg Court: Orientation won a 2009 Cybils Award in the graphic novel category. Gunnerkrigg Court was nominated for the 2014 Harvey Award for Best Online Comics Work.

Gunnerkrigg Court at the Web Cartoonists' Choice Awards and The Webcomic List Awards (TWCL)
	Wins	Nominations
2006	Outstanding Newcomer	Outstanding Use of Color; Outstanding Long Form Comic; Outstanding Story Concept
2007	Outstanding Environment Design (tie with Inverloch)	Outstanding Comic; Outstanding Long Form Comic; Outstanding Fantasy Comic
2008	Outstanding Dramatic Comic	Outstanding Writer; Outstanding Long Form Comic; Outstanding Layout; Outstanding Use of Color; Outstanding Character Rendering; Outstanding Environment Design
2009	Best Comic; Best Long Form Comic; Best Writing	Best Colour Art

== Books ==
Volume	Title	Year	ISBN	Chapters
1	Orientation	2008	978-1932386349	1–14
2	Research	2010	978-1932386776	15–22
3	Reason	2011	978-1936393237	23–31
4	Materia	2013	978-1936393992	32–41
5	Refine	2015	978-1608866915	42–49
6	Dissolve	2018	978-1608868308	50–59
7	Synthesis	2019	978-1684154418	60–68
8	Catalysis	2021	978-1684156658	69–77

- Siddell, Tom (2008). Gunnerkrigg Court: Orientation. Kearny: Archaia Entertainment. ISBN 978-1932386349. Diamond Code: FEB08 3463. Archived from the original on 1 May 2010.
  - Siddell, Tom (2008). Gunnerkrigg Court: Orientation. Titan Books. ISBN 978-1848561755.
- Siddell, Tom (2010). Gunnerkrigg Court, Volume 2: Research. Archaia Entertainment. ISBN 978-1932386776.
- Siddell, Tom (2011). Gunnerkrigg Court Volume 3: Reason. Archaia Entertainment. ISBN 978-1-936393-23-7.
- Siddell, Tom (2013). Gunnerkrigg Court, Volume 4: Materia. Archaia Entertainment. ISBN 978-1936393992.
- Siddell, Tom (2015). Gunnerkrigg Court Volume 5: Refine. Archaia Entertainment. ISBN 978-1608866915.
- Siddell, Tom (2018). Gunnerkrigg Court Volume 6: Dissolve. Archaia Entertainment. ISBN 978-1608868308.

=== Side comics ===
- Siddell, Tom (2013). Annie in the Forest Part One. Beyond The Walls. Robot Voice Comics.
- Siddell, Tom (2013). Annie in the Forest Part Two. Beyond The Walls. Robot Voice Comics.
- Siddell, Tom (2015). Traveller. Beyond The Walls. Robot Voice Comics.
- Siddell, Tom (2018). Coyote!. Beyond The Walls. Robot Voice Comics.

== Notes ==
=== Story notes ===
Preceded by Beaver and Steve	Web Cartoonists' Choice Awards: Outstanding Newcomer; 2006	Succeeded by Lackadaisy
Preceded by Copper	Web Cartoonists' Choice Awards: Outstanding Environment Design; 2007	Succeeded by Girl Genius
Preceded by Questionable Content	Web Cartoonists' Choice Awards: Outstanding Dramatic Comic; 2008	Succeeded by none
