= Léonard Willems =

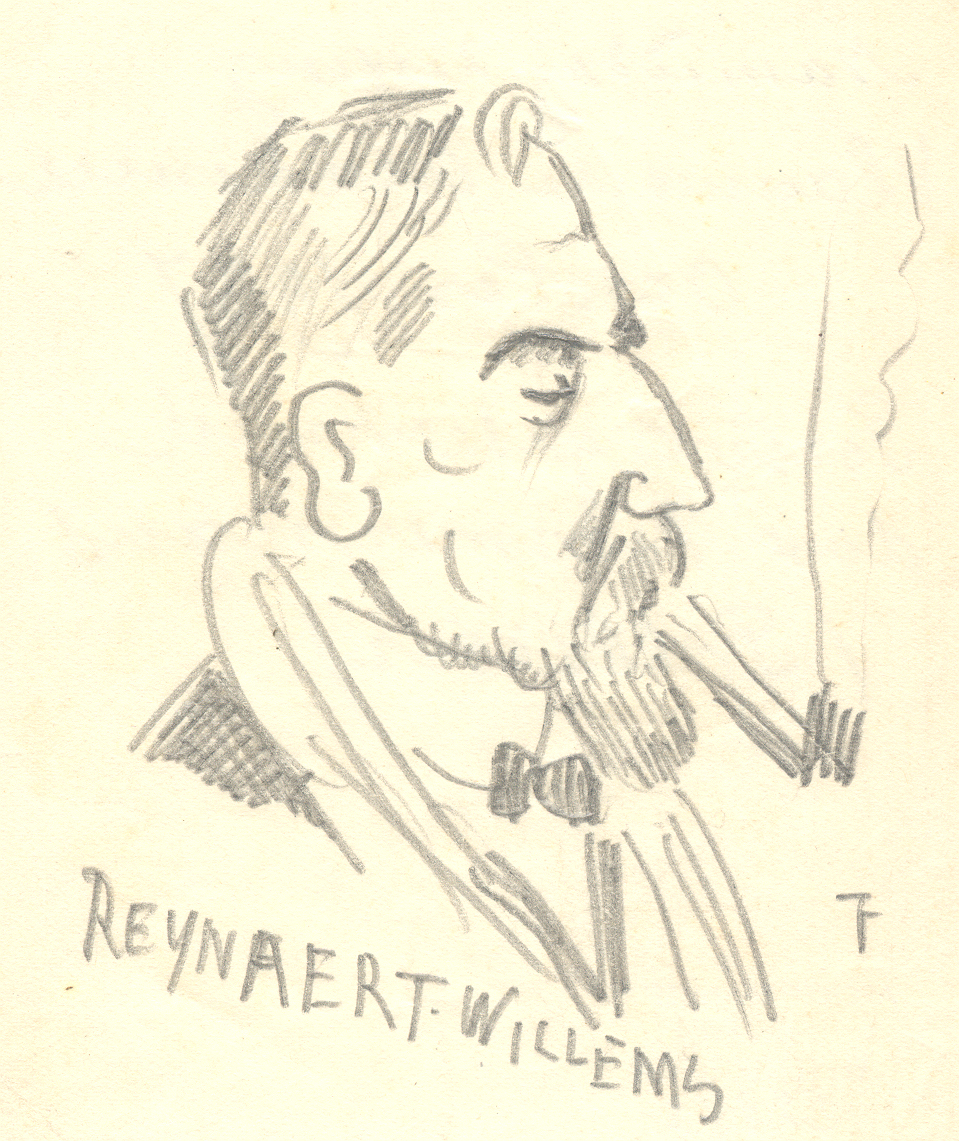
Portrait of Willems by Felix Timmermans (1937)

Léonard Willems (1864–1938) was a Flemish philologist from Brussels, Belgium, who was active in academic circles in Ghent.

== Life ==
Willems was born in Saint-Josse-ten-Noode (Brussels) on 27 January 1864, the eldest son of Alphonse Willems, professor of classical Greek at the Université libre de Bruxelles. He was educated in the classics by his father and at the Athénée royal de Bruxelles. He graduated from the University of Brussels on 16 July 1886 with a doctorate in political science. After a few terms at Bonn University studying Germanic philology (including Gothic, Old English and Middle Dutch), he matriculated at the University of Ghent, where he took Henri Pirenne's courses on historical criticism and Paul Fredericq's on Dutch literature while studying for a law degree.

His study of Ysengrimus, Étude sur l'Ysengrinus, was published in 1895. In 1896 he taught a university extension course on the philosophy of history, and became a member of the committee for the "Flandrisation" of the university (with the first courses in Dutch taught in 1906). He published numerous articles on Flemish literary history in journals, conference proceedings, and the Biographie Nationale de Belgique. His central preoccupation was the dating, composition, influences and redaction of Van den vos Reynaerde (the Dutch version of Reynard the Fox). He died in Ghent on 26 September 1938.

== Honours ==
- Willems was elected to the Koninklijke Vlaamse Academie voor Taal- en Letterkunde (Royal Flemish Academy for Language and Literature) on 31 March 1919.
- He was awarded an honorary doctorate by the University of Amsterdam on 28 June 1932.
