= Heinrich der Glïchezäre =

12th century German poet

Heinrich der Glïchezäre (i.e. the hypocrite, in the sense of one who adopts a strange name or pseudonym; also called Heinrich der Gleißner) was a Middle High German poet from Alsace, author of a narrative poem, Reinhart Fuchs (Reynard), the oldest surviving German beast epic.

The date of its composition is about 1180. It is based on a French poem, part of an extensive Roman de Renart, but older than any of the surviving branches of this romance. Of the German poem in its original form entitled Isengrînes nôt (Isengrin's trouble), only a few fragments are preserved in a mutilated manuscript discovered in 1839 in the Hessian town of Melsungen. A complete version made by an unknown hand in the thirteenth century has been preserved in two manuscripts, one at Heidelberg and one belonging to the archiepiscopal library of Kalocsa. This version is very faithful, the changes made therein pertaining apparently only to form and versification. Its title is Reinhart Fuchs.

In the beginning of this poem the fox is anything but a successful impostor, being generally outwitted by far weaker animals. But later on this changes. Reynard plays outrageous pranks on most of the animals, especially on Isengrin, the wolf, but escapes punishment by healing the sick lion. This the fox accomplishes at the expense of his adversaries. In the end he poisons the lion, his benefactor, and the poem closes with a reflection on the success attending craft and falsehood while honesty goes unrewarded.

The story is told in a plain, straightforward manner; compared with the French model the German poem shows abbreviations as well as additions, so that it is not a mere translation. The order in which the different incidents are related has also been changed, and occasional touches of satire are not wanting. The poem of der Glichezare is the only beast-epic of Middle High German literature. The famous later versions of this material are Low German. It is on one of these latter that Goethe based his Reineke Fuchs. The complete poem (from the Heidelberg manuscript) was edited by Jacob Grimm under the title Reinhart Fuchs (Berlin, 1834), and together with the older fragments by K. Reissenberger in Paul's Altdeutsche Textbibliothek, VII (Halle, 1886). The Kalocsa manuscript was published by Mailáth and Köffinger (Budapest, 1817). Selections are found in P. Piper's Die Spielmannsdichtung (in Kurschner, Deutsche National literatur, II), pt. I, 287-315.
