= Appeal to loyalty =

Logical fallacy

The appeal to loyalty is a logical fallacy committed when the premise of an argument uses a perceived need for loyalty of some sort to distract from the issue being discussed.

Example
B questions A's statement of x.
Anyone who questions A is disloyal.
Therefore, B is wrong.

Problem: Even if B is disloyal, that doesn't mean that B is wrong, as A is not necessarily always right.

== See also ==
- Groupthink
- Blood is thicker than water
