= Maleperduis =

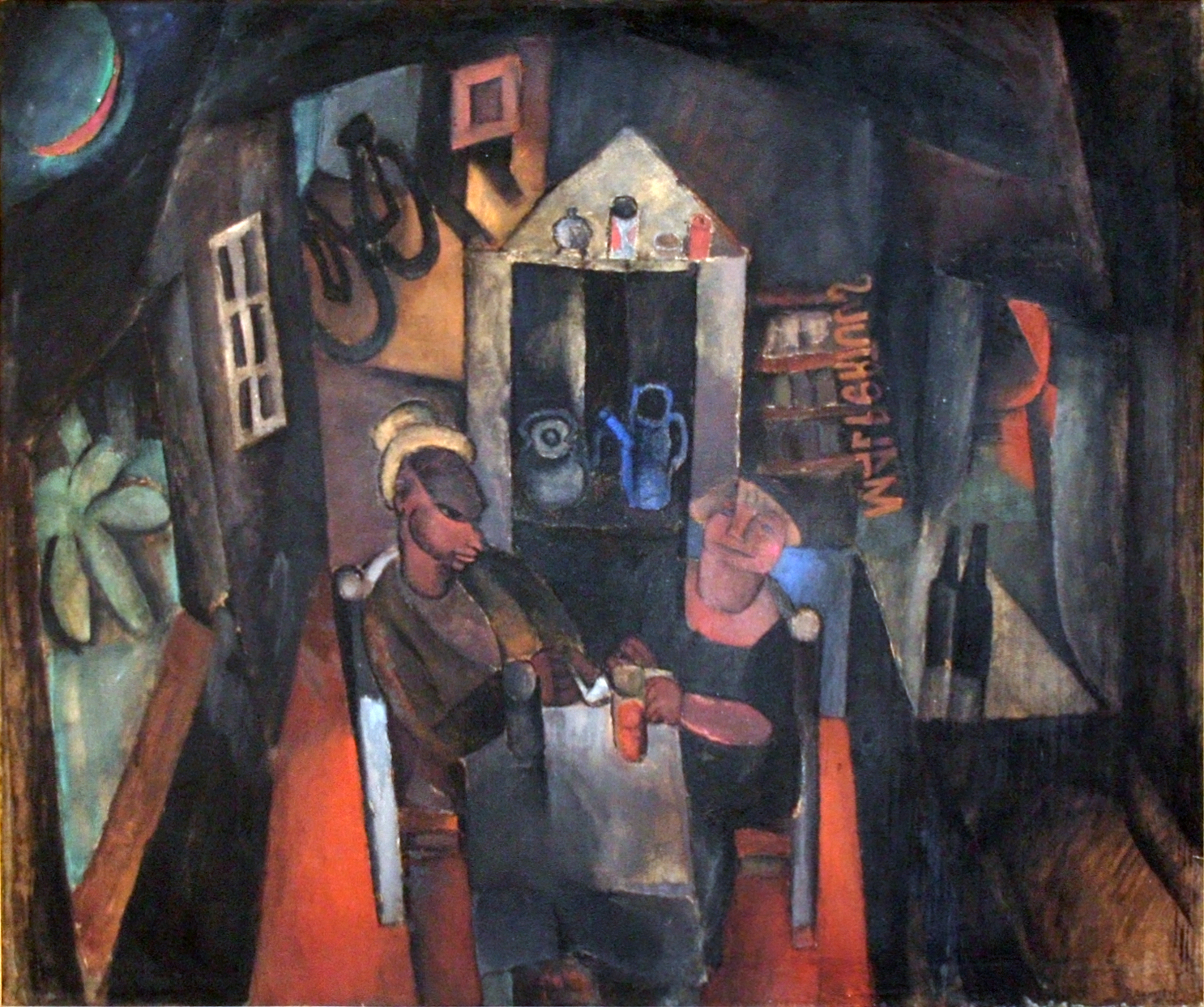
Malpertuus by Frits Van den Berghe (Museum of Fine Arts, Ghent)

Maleperduis (/ˌmælɪˈpɜːrdjuɪs/; French: Maupertuis; German: Malepartus; Dutch: Maupertuus; Middle English: Maleperduys), also spelled Malperdy, is Reynard the Fox's principal hideaway in the medieval tales of this figure of legend. The first extant versions of Reynard's literary cycle date from the second half of the 12th century. The name of the castle is most likely an old misspelling of the French word "Millepertuis", meaning "St. John's Wort", which was considered a sacred plant during the days the Reynard cycle was first written.

Labyrinthine Maleperduys is full of holes, crooked and long, with multiple exits, which Reynard can open and shut to elude his enemies. Full of secret chambers and passageways, in William Caxton's The Historie of Reynart the Foxe (1485) the castle of Maleperduys is described as the "best and the fastest burgh that [Reynard] had. There lay he in when he had need, and was in any dread or fear." (Chapter VII, How Bruin the Bear was sped of Reynard the Fox). Over time, the word came to mean a place of refuge.

It is also the title of a gothic novel, written in 1943 by the Belgian author, Jean Ray. In 1972, it was made into a film, Malpertuis, directed by Harry Kümel and starring Orson Welles.
