= Antimony Carver =

Publication information
- First appearance: Gunnerkrigg Court
- Created by: Tom Siddell

In-story information
- Notable aliases: Annie; Fire head girl

Antimony "Annie" Carver is the main protagonist of Tom Siddell's 2005 webcomic Gunnerkrigg Court. She was the first character created for Gunnerkrigg Court and her design has evolved alongside the webcomic's artstyle. Characterized as quiet, shy and precocious, as well as lonely and subtly rebellious, Antimony has been praised for her complexity.

== Creation ==
Gunnerkrigg Court began as two doodles of Antimony.

Gunnerkrigg Court was conceptualized from a doodle Tom Siddell was sketching one day.

"I drew a very stylized girl with a bored look that was quite different to the usual stuff I was drawing at the time. I did another sketch right after that of the same girl and, wanting to color it but only having a very limited selection of marker pens, put her in an ugly school uniform with some crazy makeup. At that point, I decided that I liked her enough to make a comic about her. I thought up some ideas and drew the first couple of chapters before putting it online, and it went from there."

— Tom Siddell, interview with Comic Book Resources

Alchemical symbol for antimony

After designing the character, Siddell decided a "strange school" would fit her personality. He named the house Antimony is in at Gunnerkrigg Court "Queslett North", after his own former house. Delos Woodruff of Comic Fencing suggested that Antimony may be named after the metal of the same name, pointing out that the alchemical symbol for antimony is commonly shown in the webcomic.

El Santo of The Webcomic Overlook noted that, as the art style of Gunnerkrigg Court evolved, so did Antimony's design. The character was initially drawn as a short girl with a "football-shaped head", but slowly evolved to be taller and more "elegant". El Santo said that these changes complement Antimony's emotional growth and maturity in the webcomic.

== Character ==
The story of Gunnerkrigg Court starts with young girl Antimony Carver entering Gunnerkrigg Court, a boarding school with "strange" properties. Antimony's mother died while she was young, and her father remains emotionally distant from her. Antimony is described by Michael May of Comic Book Resources as a "quiet, pleasant girl[;] lonely, but not angsty about it". At the start of the story, she is considered an outsider by the rest of the students, save for her close friend Katerina "Kat" Donlan. Greg Burgas, also writing for Comic Book Resources, described Antimony's "reserved and thoughtful" nature as a contrast with Kat's more "vivacious and rebellious" character, but noted that Antimony also has some subtle rebellious facets. Delos Woodruff of Comic Fencing noticed that Antimony seems to act older than she really is, as she knows how to pick locks, speaks several languages and knows some martial arts.

Over the course of the story, Antimony becomes more involved with the mystical woods outside of the school. She owns a stuffed animal with the demon Reynardine inside, who helps her deal with the various situations she finds herself in. Furthermore, she inherited the ability to escort the spirits of the dead to the afterlife from her mother. As the story continues, it becomes apparent that Antimony is coping with issues of abandonment and of inadequacy and that her initial emotional detachment is in actuality a social impairment.

== Reception ==
Though Katie Schenkel of ComicsAlliance noted that "all the characters have their charms and appeal", she stated that the manner in which Siddell had written Antimony is particularly interesting. Schenkel pointed out that Antimony is "flawed" despite having extraordinary talent, being somewhat secretive, selfish and self-loathing, and making big mistakes throughout the story. Schenkel praised the character by saying that it is "nice to see a protagonist handled with this much care and complexity". Joe Zabel of The Webcomics Examiner stated that he was particularly fond of Antimony's character design, noting her "distinctive mascara-tinted eyes and high cheekbones", which make the character look older and more composed.

Burgas said that Siddell did a good job of making Antimony and Kat seem very precocious while reminding the reader every once in a while that the characters are indeed still children. Tris McCall of Inside Jersey praised Antimony's character strongly, stating that "to call her anything less than magnetic would be a gross understatement." Michael Burgin of Paste Magazine called Antimony a "marvelously opaque, unpredictable protagonist", stating that the most moving and memorable moments in Gunnerkrigg Court are when Antimony "falters in her friendships or is called out for her flaws". Siddell himself has said that Antimony is his favorite character in Gunnerkrigg Court.
