= The Story of Reynard the Fox =

1794 epic poem by Johann Wolfgang von Goethe

- 1846 illustration by Wilhelm von Kaulbach
- Author: Johann Wolfgang von Goethe
- Original title: Reineke Fuchs
- Language: German
- Publisher: Johann Friedrich Unger
- Publication date: 1794
- Publication place: Prussia
- Pages: 491

The Story of Reynard the Fox (German: Reineke Fuchs) is an epic poem by the German writer Johann Wolfgang von Goethe. It is an animal fable that mocks court life, based on the medieval story of Reynard the Fox.

Goethe's principal source was Johann Christoph Gottsched's 1752 prose adaptation of the poem Reynke de vos, first printed in 1498, which Goethe retold in twelve hexameter songs. Goethe wrote the poem in 1793 and Johann Friedrich Unger published it in 1794.
