= Ysengrimus =

12th-century Latin beast epic

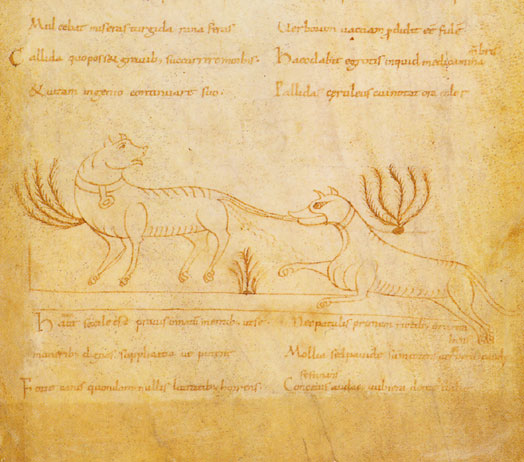
Reynard and Isengrim in a medieval French manuscript (Bibliothèque nationale de France). The Ysengrimus stands at the head of the European tradition of Reynard the Fox.

Ysengrimus is a Latin beast epic and mock-epic, a cycle of anthropomorphic fables written in or near Ghent in 1148 or 1149. Its title character is Isengrim the wolf, a greedy and gullible monk, who is repeatedly deceived, humiliated and finally destroyed by the trickster fox Reynard (Latin Reinardus). Running to 6,574 lines of elegiac couplets, it is the most extensive medieval beast poem in Latin and the first work in any language to give the fox and the wolf the names by which they became known across Europe.

The poem is a satire of the monastic and clerical world of its day, in which the wolf embodies the worldly, avaricious "monk-bishop," and his sufferings are ironically staged as ecclesiastical honors. It is known for its learned, difficult, and highly rhetorical Latin and its scatological, sexual, and violent comedy. Although it used to be relatively unknown because of the difficulty of its language, Ysengrimus is now regarded as one of the comic works of the Middle Ages. It gave rise to the vernacular Reynard cycle, including the Old French Roman de Renart, the Middle Dutch Van den vos Reynaerde, and William Caxton's English Reynard.

== Title and text ==
The poem is transmitted complete in five manuscripts, and excerpts survive in ten florilegia (medieval anthologies of selected passages). It was first printed by Franz Joseph Mone in 1832 under the title Reinardus Vulpes ("Reynard the Fox"), taken from the fox rather than the wolf. The standard critical edition, published by Ernst Voigt in 1884, established the title Ysengrimus, after the wolf who is the true protagonist, and this has been used ever since. Léonard Willems argued in 1895 for the spelling Ysengrinus, with an n, which is found in three of the five manuscripts, but Voigt's m spelling, which matches the Germanic etymology of the name, prevailed.

The text is written in elegiac couplets, a metre borrowed from classical models, and is arranged in seven books. These contain twelve or fourteen tales, depending on how the episodes are divided; the twelve-tale division proposed by Jacob Grimm is the most widely followed. A shorter later reworking of two of the episodes, the Ysengrimus abbreviatus, circulated separately from the late 13th century.

== Authorship ==
The complete manuscripts transmit the poem anonymously, and its authorship is genuinely uncertain. Later and partial witnesses give three different names. A 14th-century copy of the Florilegium Gallicum heads its extracts "magister Nivardus", and it is from this that the conventional attribution to a "Nivardus" derives; another copy calls the maxims drawn from the poem "Proverbia Bernardi", ascribing them to a "Bernardus"; and two further references name "Balduinus Cecus" (Baldwin the Blind). A separate hypothesis, argued by A. Van Geertsom in 1962, identifies the author with the bear Bruno, who becomes an internal narrator in the third book. Jill Mann, in the introduction to her standard edition, discusses these attributions at length and concludes that the poem is best regarded as anonymous; the name "Nivardus of Ghent" nonetheless remains conventional, having been adopted by Voigt.

Whatever his name, the author was plainly a highly educated cleric, almost certainly a monk, writing in or near Ghent. The poem is steeped in the ecclesiastical geography of Flanders, mentioning the abbeys of Ghent and the churchmen of the region, and it directs pointed hostility at named contemporaries, among them Anselm, bishop of Tournai, and Pope Eugenius III.

== Date ==
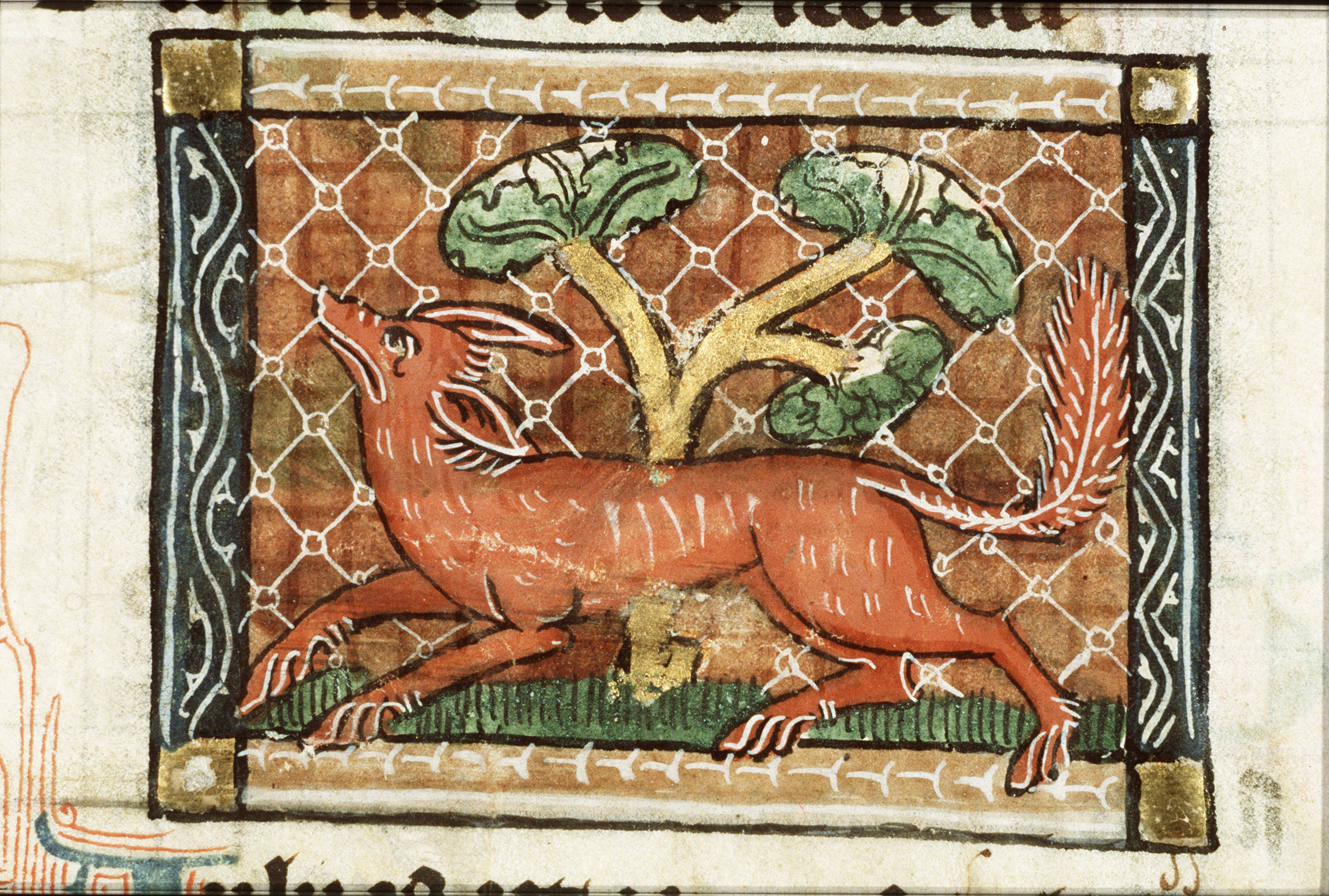
A fox in Der naturen bloeme, a 13th-century Flemish encyclopaedia by Jacob van Maerlant. The Ysengrimus was composed in Flanders, at Ghent.

The poem can be dated closely to 1148 or 1149 from its topical allusions. It refers to Anselm as bishop of Tournai, an office he held from 1146 until his death in 1149, and to the reigning Pope Eugenius III (1145–1153), and it laments the recent failure of the Second Crusade of 1147 to 1148. Scholars accordingly place its composition between the spring of 1148 and August 1149.

== Sources and models ==
The Ysengrimus draws together several earlier traditions. Its most important Latin predecessor is the 11th-century Ecbasis captivi, the oldest surviving medieval beast fable, in which the opposition of wolf and fox first appears, though there the animals are unnamed. It also draws on the classical and medieval Aesopic fable tradition transmitted through Phaedrus, on the widespread folk tale of the sick lion healed by a wolf's skin, and on the Latin poetry of Ovid, whose elegiac manner it both imitates and parodies. It is the most extensive anthropomorphic beast poem in Latin and the first text to name the fox Reinardus and the wolf Ysengrimus.

== Style and language ==
The poem mixes classical and medieval Latin and is written in a learned, difficult and highly wrought style. Parts of it use deliberately obscure grammatical forms, such as deponent imperatives, which serve as a means of characterization rather than mere display: the poet gives such ambiguous and deceptive language to the trickster Reynard, and to Isengrim when he too is lying, whereas the wolf speaks plainly once he has been trapped. Mann has described the result as a "cartoon world" in which language floats free of reality and is governed only by comic ingenuity.

== Synopsis ==
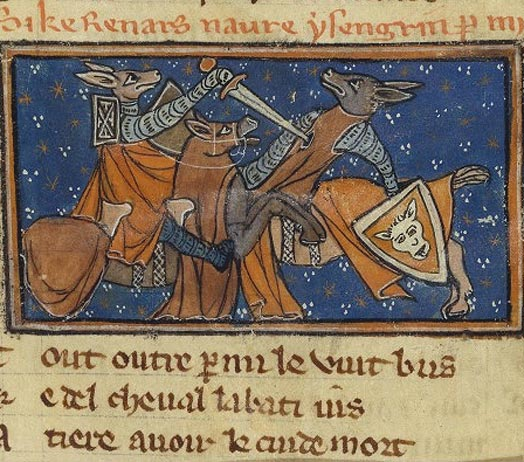
Fox (left) and wolf (right) in a miniature (BnF, MS fr. 1581, f. 6v) from Renart le Nouvel by Jacquemart Giélée (c. 1290–1300).

In the opening episode, the wolf, sharing out a stolen flitch (Note: A flitch is the side, or a steak cut from the side, of an animal or fish. The term now usually occurs only in connection with a side of salted and cured pork in the phrase a flitch of bacon.) of bacon, contrives to keep it all and leave the fox only the cord it hung from; this is Isengrim's single success, and for the rest of the poem he is continually outwitted. In the best-known episode Reynard persuades the wolf to fish through a hole in the ice using his tail as a net; the tail freezes fast, villagers fall upon him, and he escapes only by tearing it off. Urged by the mocking fox to hurry, the trapped wolf retorts:

Captus ad hec captor: "Nescis quid, perfide, dicas. / Clunibus impendet Scotia tota meis."

— The captured captor replied: "You do not know what you are saying, traitor. I have the whole of Scotland hanging from my buttocks."

Thereafter Isengrim is crushed by sheep, and flayed alive when Reynard, posing as a physician, convinces the sick lion king that only the skin of a wolf can cure him. In a group of episodes narrated by Bruno the bear, the wolf is lured into becoming a monk in order to gorge himself and is beaten by the monastery's brethren. While Isengrim is away at the monastery, Reynard visits the wolf's den, where the she-wolf, who is left unnamed in the poem but becomes the Hersent of the later French tradition, has just given birth; the fox fouls her newborn cubs with excrement and, in the text as transmitted, rapes her. The wolf is subsequently kicked by a mare, butted by a ram, flayed a second time, and tricked into gnawing off his own paw. In the final episode, the great sow Salaura entices him within reach of her herd, and a drove of 66 pigs devours him alive.

== Themes and interpretation ==
=== Satire ===
The poem is a sustained satire of clerical and monastic greed. Isengrim is repeatedly cast as a monk who longs to become an abbot and bishop; Mann reads him as the worldly ecclesiastic who is at once abbot and bishop, his appetite matching the wolf's, and argues that each episode is contrived so that the punishment fits the monk-bishop's vice, producing an upside-down world in which the predator becomes the prey, the wolf's sufferings being ironically dressed as ecclesiastical honours (his flaying, for instance, presented as a mock episcopal consecration). Reynard is not a champion of the weak but the relentless agent of the wolf's ruin, a fox whose sole purpose is to make a fool of his uncle, triumphing through language and cunning. Jan Ziolkowski compares the poet's stance to that of George Orwell in Animal Farm, suggesting that satire of an institution need not imply rejection of the ideal behind it.

=== Violence, obscenity and the body ===
The satire is carried by an accumulation of bodily violence and degradation extreme even by medieval standards. In the course of the poem the wolf is beaten to a pulp, flayed alive twice, crushed, kicked and butted, tricked into gnawing off his own paw, and at last eaten alive by a drove of 66 pigs; the comedy is built throughout from excrement, wounds, mutilation and sexual humiliation. Modern critics reach for the vocabulary of the animated cartoon to describe this relentless, escalating punishment: Mann speaks of the poem's "cartoon-like violence", and a recent reviewer likens it to "a Tex Avery cartoon". The cruelty nonetheless goes far beyond slapstick. Its starkest instance is the wolf-den episode, in which Reynard, during Isengrim's absence, fouls his newborn cubs with excrement and rapes the she-wolf; scenes of this kind make the poem genuinely shocking to modern readers, and the medievalist Thomas W. Best regarded the rape as an indignity added by a later copyist rather than part of Nivardus's original. How the violence should be taken is disputed: Mann maintains that it reflects not a gratuitous delight in cruelty but a precise satiric aim, yet the disproportion between the wolf's largely petty offences and his sufferings is such that the ridiculous Isengrim acquires a measure of pathos, and the fox can come to seem worse than his victim.

=== Religion and the Crusade ===
The obscenity is inseparable from a sustained parody of religion. The wolf's tortures are couched in the language of the liturgy and of hagiography, and as he dies he pronounces a burlesque curse invoking a demon named Agemundus, in parody of an appeal to a patron saint. The poem also engages directly with the religious politics of the Second Crusade, whose recent failure the last book laments as it turns increasingly apocalyptic. The manner of Isengrim's death, devoured by swine, has been read by Mann as casting him as a "false prophet", in allusion to the medieval Christian legend that Muhammad had been eaten by pigs. In the same book, the sow's prophetic speech folds in the catastrophe of the Crusade and includes the line "Non ergo Hebraeos miror gentesque perire" ("So I do not wonder that the Hebrews and the nations perish"), which Mann identifies as an allusion to the massacres of Jews in the Rhineland connected with Crusade preaching in 1146.

== Influence and legacy ==
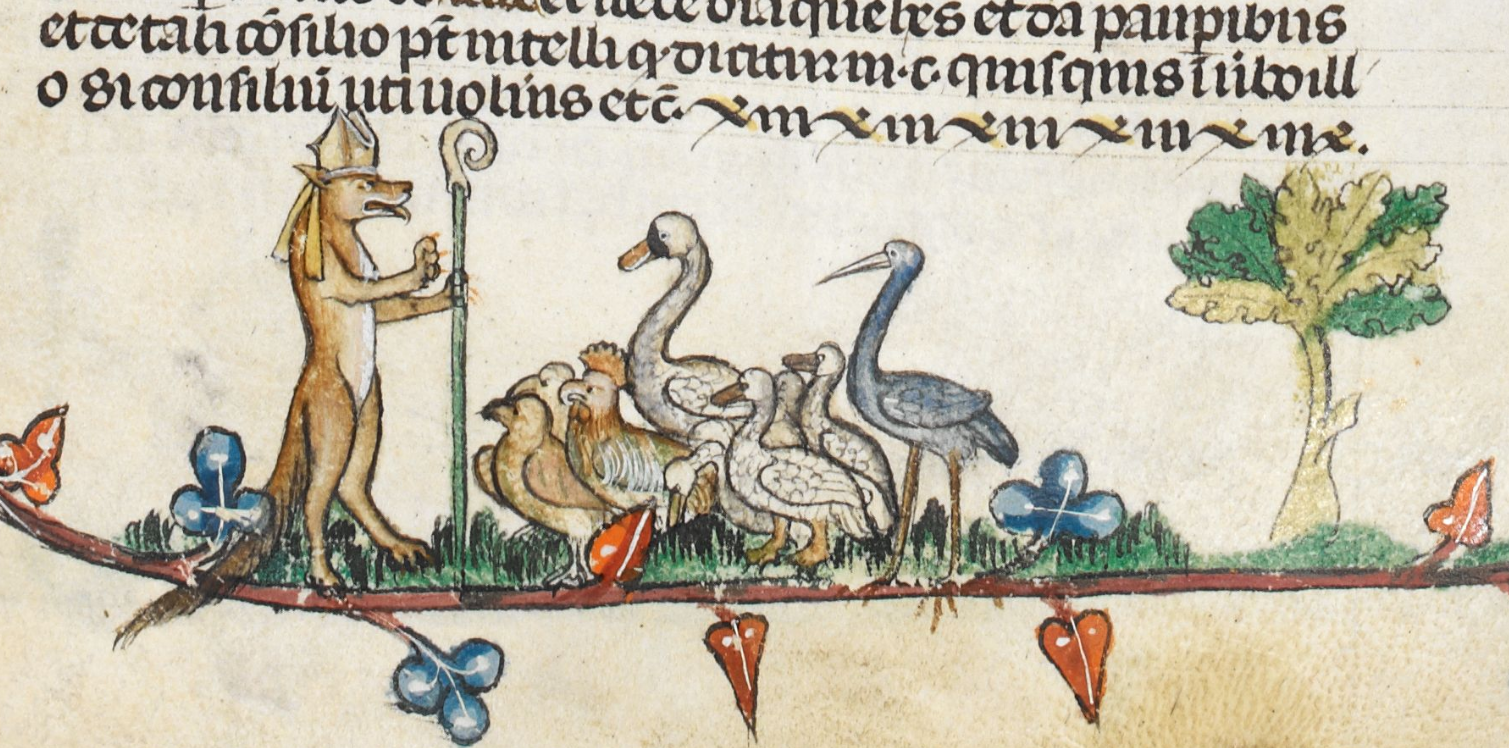
Reynard preaching to geese, in the margin of a 14th-century English manuscript (British Library, Royal MS 10 E IV). The Ysengrimus originated the fox and wolf of the later Reynard tradition.

The Ysengrimus stands at the head of the European tradition of Reynard the Fox. Several of its fox-and-wolf stories reappear, little changed, in the Old French Roman de Renart, begun about 1170 by Pierre de Saint-Cloud, and the tradition passed into the Middle High German Reinhart Fuchs (c. 1180), the Middle Dutch Van den vos Reynaerde (13th century), and William Caxton's English The Historye of Reynart the Foxe (1481).

The success of these fox stories left a permanent mark on the French language. The ordinary Old French word for "fox" was goupil (from Latin vulpecula), but the popularity of the fox hero caused his personal name, Renart, to displace it, so that renard became the standard French word for the animal; the older goupil survives only as an archaism. The shift is usually credited to the vernacular Roman de Renart rather than to the Latin poem directly, though it was the Ysengrimus that first created the character and gave him his Latin name.

== Editions and translations ==
- Franz Joseph Mone (ed.), Reinardus Vulpes (Stuttgart and Tübingen, 1832). Editio princeps.
- Ernst Voigt (ed.), Ysengrimus (Halle, 1884). Standard critical edition.
- F. J. Sypher and Eleanor Sypher (trans.), Ysengrimus (New York, 1980). English prose translation.
- Jill Mann (ed. and trans.), Ysengrimus (Leiden: Brill, 1987) ISBN 9004081038. Text, translation and commentary.
- Élisabeth Charbonnier (trans.), Le Roman d'Ysengrin (Paris: Les Belles Lettres, 1991).
- Mark Nieuwenhuis (trans.), Ysengrimus (Amsterdam, 1997). Dutch translation.
- Jill Mann (ed. and trans.), Ysengrimus (Cambridge, MA: Harvard University Press, 2013) ISBN 9780674724822. Dumbarton Oaks Medieval Library.
- Michael Schilling (ed. and trans.), Ysengrimus (Berlin: De Gruyter, 2020) ISBN 9783110663150. German translation.
