= Reynard the Fox =

Cycle of medieval, allegorical, Flemish fable

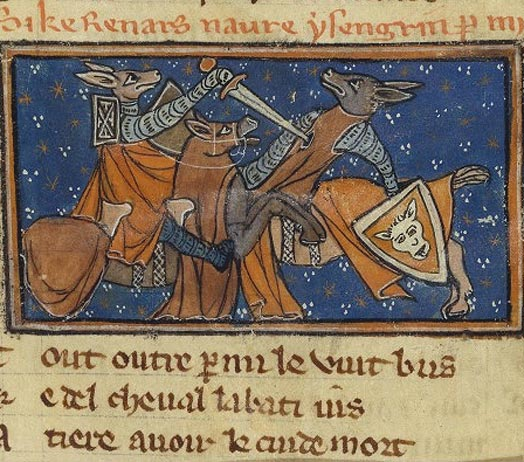
An illumination from a late 13th century manuscript of the Roman de Renart

Reynard the Fox (French: Roman de Renart) is a literary cycle of medieval allegorical Dutch, English, French and German fables. The first extant versions of the cycle date from the second half of the 12th century. The genre was popular throughout the Late Middle Ages, as well as in chapbook form throughout the Early Modern period.

The stories are largely concerned with the main character Reynard, an anthropomorphic red fox and trickster figure. His adventures usually involve him deceiving other anthropomorphic animals for his own advantage, or trying to avoid their retaliatory efforts. His main enemy and victim across the cycle is his uncle, the wolf, Isengrim (or Ysengrim).

While the character of Reynard appears in later works, the core stories were written during the Middle Ages by multiple authors and are often seen as parodies of medieval literature, such as courtly love stories and chansons de geste, as well as a satire of political and religious institutions. The trickster fox, Reynard, lives in a society of other talking animals (lion, bear, wolf, donkey, etc.), making the stories a beast epic.

The original copies were written in Old French, and have since been translated into many different languages. However, the tales of Reynard come from all across Europe and each retelling has details that are specific to its area. The tales, no matter where they take place, are designed to represent the society around them and include the structures of society around them, such as a noble court. While the authors take many liberties with the story telling, not all of the satire is meant to be rude or malicious in intent.

== Characters ==
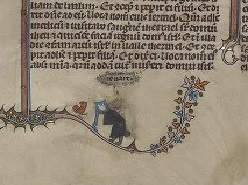
A defaced Reynard preaches to a rooster.

The main characters are anthropomorphic animals. The given names of the animals are of Old High German origin. Most of them were in common use as personal names in medieval Lorraine. The characters of Reynard the Fox were based on the medieval hierarchy, and are treated as human throughout the tales. Since multiple authors wrote the text, characters' personalities often change. Throughout the stories, these characters often switch between human and animal form and often without notice.

The characters who switch between human and animal form are often those of elite status, while the characters who don't change tend to be peasants. Often, the readers will find themselves able to empathize with Reynard. They find that the situations he is in are not often significantly different from their own lives, and this carries across the decades. The common usage of animals as characters in tales has made it so the stories that touch on morally gray areas are easier to understand and accept.

- Reynard the Fox. The given name Reynard is from Reginhard, Raginohardus "strong in counsel". Because of the popularity of the Reynard stories, renard became the standard French word for "fox", replacing the old French word for "fox", which was goupil from Latin vulpēcula. Since Reynard has been written about in many different times and places across the world, it is not uncommon to see changes in his appearance to fit the natural surroundings of his story. His fur is often used as a camouflage, meaning if the story was written in a snowy landscape he will have white fur, or yellow fur for desert areas, and in the wooded areas of a forest, he is depicted in red fur.
- Isengrim the Wolf, see Ysengrimus
- Tibert the Cat. See Tybalt, Prince of cats
- King Noble the Lion; see king of beasts
- Bruin the Bear
- Hermeline the Vixen
- Grimbard the Badger
- Baldwin the Ass
- Bayard the Horse
- Hirsent the She-wolf
- Kyward the Hare, also Coart, Cuwaert, a coward.
- Chanticleer the Cock
- Bellin the Ram
- Martin the Ape, who had a son named Moneke who may be the source of the word monkey.
- Curtise the Hound, who appears in a 1620 anonymous book entitled "The most delectable history of Reynard the Fox"

== In medieval European folklore and literature ==
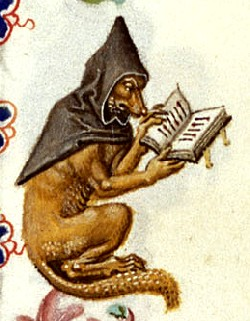
A studious fox in a monk's cowl, in the margins of a book of hours, Utrecht, c. 1460

Foxes in general have the reputation of tricksters in traditional European folklore. The specific character of Reynard is thought to have originated in Lorraine folklore, from where it spread to France, Germany, and the Low Countries. Alternatively, a 19th-century edition of a retelling of the Reynard fable states definitively with "no doubt whatever that it is of German origin" and relates a conjecture associating the central character with "a certain Reinard of Lorraine, famous for his vulpine qualities in the ninth century".

Joseph Jacobs, while seeing an origin in Lorraine, traces classical, German, and "ancient northern folk-lore" elements within the Reynard stories. Jacob Grimm in his Reinhart Fuchs (Berlin, 1834) provided evidence for the supposition on etymological grounds that "stories of the Fox and Wolf were known to the Franks as early as the fourth, fifth, and sixth centuries".

From the twelfth and thirteenth centuries there are around twenty-six different tales of Reynard the Fox that survive today. These were written by multiple authors, some of whom are anonymous.

An extensive appearance of the character is in the Old French Le Roman de Renart written by Pierre de Saint-Cloud around 1170, which sets the typical setting. Reynard has been summoned to the court of king Noble (or Leo), the lion, to answer charges brought against him by Isengrim the wolf. Other anthropomorphic animals, including Bruin the bear, Baldwin the ass, and Tibert (Tybalt) the cat, all attempt one stratagem or another. The stories typically involve satire, whose usual butts are the aristocracy and the clergy, making Reynard a peasant-hero character. The Catholic Church used the story of the preaching fox, as found in the Reynard literature, in church art as propaganda against the Lollards.

Reynard's principal castle, Maupertuis, is available to him whenever he needs to hide away from his enemies. Some of the tales feature Reynard's funeral, where his enemies gather to deliver maudlin elegies full of insincere piety, and which feature Reynard's posthumous revenge. Reynard's wife Hermeline appears in the stories, but plays little active role. In some versions she remarries when Reynard is thought dead, thereby becoming one of the people he plans revenge upon. Isengrim, alternate French spelling: Ysengrin, is Reynard's most frequent antagonist and foil. He generally ends up outwitted, though he occasionally gets revenge.

An individual tale might span several genres, which makes classification difficult. Tales often include themes from contemporary society with references to relics, pilgrimage, confession, and the crusades. There is debate over whether or how closely they related to identifiable societal events, but there is a growing camp that see direct societal connections and even implicit political statements in the tales. The stories are told in a way that makes associations easy to make, but difficult to substantiate.

Reynard stories translate difficult laws and legal concepts into common language, allowing people to both understand them and enjoy the legal predicaments and antics of the characters. The court operates just as those in medieval society. The king heard cases only on one specified date, and all disputes were heard at once.

=== Ysengrimus ===
Reynard appears first in the medieval Latin poem Ysengrimus, a long Latin mock-epic written c. 1148–53 by the medieval poet Nivardus, that collects a great store of Reynard's adventures. He also appears in a number of Latin sequences by the early-13th-century preacher Odo of Cheriton. Both of these early sources seem to draw on a pre-existing store of popular culture featuring the character.

=== Roman de Renart ===
The first "branch" (or chapter) of the Roman de Renart appears in 1174, written by Pierre de St. Cloud, although in all French editions it is designated as "Branch II". The same author wrote a sequel in 1179—called "Branch I". From that date onwards, many other French authors composed their own adventures for Renart li goupil ("the fox"). There is also the Middle High German text Reinhard Fuchs by Heinrich der Glïchezäre, dated to c. 1180. Roman de Renart fits into the genre of romance. Roman de Renart gets its start using the history of fables that have been written since the time of Aesop.

The romance genre of the Middle Ages is not what we think of the romance genre of today. It was a fictional telling of a character's life. The protagonist of the romance genre often has an adventure or a call to action, almost always caused by an outside force. In the 13th century, French was a standard literary language, and many works during the Middle Ages were written in French, including Reynard the Fox. Many popular works from the Middle Ages fall into the romance genre.

Pierre de St. Cloud opens his work on the fox by situating it within the larger tradition of epic poetry, the fabliaux and Arthurian romance:

Seigneurs, oï avez maint conte
Que maint conterre vous raconte
Conment Paris ravi Elaine,
Le mal qu'il en ot et la paine,
De Tristan que la Chievre fist
Qui assez bellement en dist
Et fabliaus et chançons de geste
Romanz d'Yvain et de sa beste
Maint autre conte par la terre.
Mais onques n'oïstes la guerre
Qui tant fu dure de gran fin,
Entre Renart et Ysengrin.

Translation:

Lords, you have heard many tales,
That many tellers have told to you.
How Paris took Helen,
The evil and the pain he felt
Of Tristan that la Chevre
Spoke rather beautifully about;
And fabliaux and epics;
Of the Romance of Yvain and his beast
And many others told in this land
But never have you heard about the war
That was difficult and lengthy
Between Reynard and Isengrim

=== Van den vos Reynaerde ===
A mid-13th-century Middle Dutch version of the story by Willem die Madoc maecte (Van den vos Reynaerde, Of Reynaert the Fox), is also made up of rhymed verses (the same AA BB scheme). Van den vos Reinaerde and Reinaert Historie (referred to as R I and R II, respectively) are two poems written by two different authors with R II being a continuation of R I.

With different writers comes different variations. This can best be seen with Reynard. While describing the same character the Reynard from R I has many different character traits of that in R II. While a finished and completed poem by itself, Van den vos Reinaerde does not have a set ending.

Like Pierre, very little is known of the author, other than the description by the copyist in the first sentences:

Willem, die Madocke maecte,
daer hi dicken omme waecte,
hem vernoyde so haerde
dat die avonture van Reynaerde
in Dietsche onghemaket bleven
– die Arnout niet hevet vulscreven –
dat hi die vijte dede soucken
ende hise na den Walschen boucken
in Dietsche dus hevet begonnen.

Translation:

Willem who made Madocke,
which often kept him awake,
was so extremely annoyed
that the tales of Reynaert
– which Arnout has not finished –
remained unwritten in Dutch
that he had the life looked for
and, following the French books
he began it in Dutch as follows.

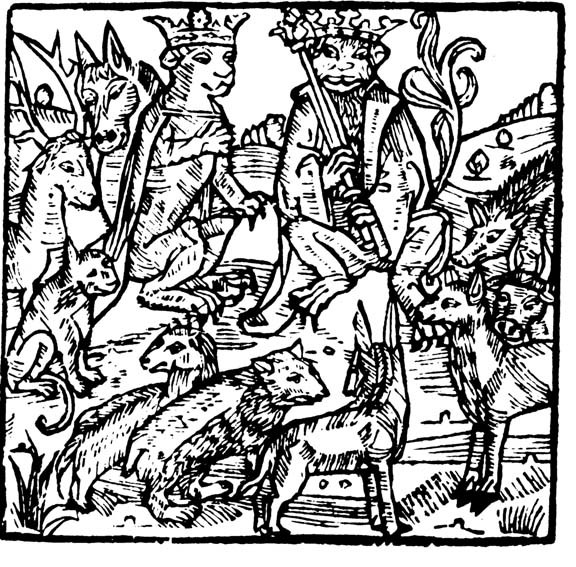
A 1498 illustration from Hans van Ghetelen, in Reinke de Vos

Madocke or Madoc is thought to be another one of Willem's works that at one point existed but had been lost. The Arnout mentioned was an earlier Reynard poet whose work Willem (the writer) alleges to have finished. However, there are serious objections to this notion of joint authorship, and the only thing deemed likely is that Arnout was French-speaking ("Walschen" in Middle Dutch referred to northern French-speaking people, specifically the Walloons). Willem's work became one of the standard versions of the legend, and was the foundation for most later adaptations in Dutch, German, and English, including those of William Caxton, Goethe, and F. S. Ellis.

=== Chaucer ===
Geoffrey Chaucer used Reynard material in the Canterbury Tales; in "The Nun's Priest's Tale", Reynard appears as "Rossel" and an ass as "Brunel". Reynard (spelt "Renard") is also briefly mentioned in The Legend of Phyllis from Chaucer's The Legend of Good Women.

== Early Modern tradition ==
In 1481, the English William Caxton printed The Historie of Reynart the Foxe, which was translated from Van den vos Reynaerde. Also in the 1480s, the Scottish poet Robert Henryson devised a highly sophisticated development of Reynardian material as part of his Morall Fabillis in the sections known as The Talking of the Tod. In 1498, Hans van Ghetelen, a printer of Incunabula in Lübeck, printed a Low German version called Reinke de Vos. It was translated to Latin and other languages, which made the tale popular across Europe. Reynard is also referenced in the Middle English poem Sir Gawain and the Green Knight during the third hunt.

Tybalt in Shakespeare's Romeo and Juliet is named after the cat in Reynard the Fox, and is called 'Prince of Cats' by Mercutio in reference to this. Jonson's play Volpone is heavily indebted to Reynard.

With the invention of the printing press, the tales of Reynard the fox became more popular and started to be translated and recreated in many different languages. The tales of Reynard don't follow the typical sense of reprinting, as there is no clear chronology to the stories. Many of the original pages to these stories have been lost, so it is difficult to tell what the exact literary changes are, of which there aren't many, with the exception of the typical changes that are seen from the early days of the printing press.

There are also slight changes to the wording that show modernization of the uses and differing orders of the words. While the changes might appear to be mistakes, they are not thought of as such and are often kept in the modernization of the tales. There were few many [which?] attempts to better the works during the fifteenth and sixteenth centuries. Changes to the tales during the fifteenth century are not seen as mistakes because of specific roles in the process of printing designed to eliminate mistakes. In the early modern editions of Reynard the Fox, the characteristics of the animals were based on literary topoi, appealing to the middle class reader.

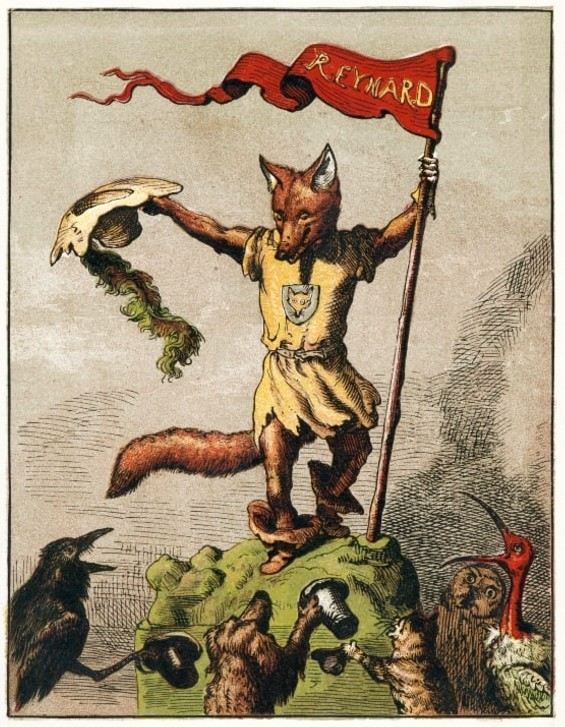
The trickster figure Reynard the Fox as depicted in an 1869 children's book by Michel Rodange

== Modern treatment ==
=== 19th century ===
The Story of Reynard the Fox (German: Reinecke Fuchs) by Johann Wolfgang von Goethe is a poem in hexameters, in twelve parts, written 1793 and first published 1794. Goethe adapted the Reynard material from the edition by Johann Christoph Gottsched (1752), based on the 1498 Reynke de vos.

In Friedrich Nietzsche's 1889 The Twilight of the Idols, Nietzsche uses Reynard the Fox as an example of a dialectician.

German artist Johann Heinrich Ramberg made a series of thirty drawings, which he also etched and published in 1825.

Renert [full original title: Renert oder de Fuuß am Frack an a Ma'nsgrëßt], was published in 1872 by Michel Rodange, a Luxembourgish author. An epic satirical work—adapted from the 1858 Cotta Edition of Goethe's fox epic Reineke Fuchs to a setting in Luxembourg. It is known to be a satirical mirror image of Luxembourg's social sphere after the turmoils of the Luxembourg Crisis, whereby the author transposed his criticism and social scepticism to the animal society in which his fox 'Renert' lives. Beyond that, it is insightful analysis of the different regional and sub-regional linguistic differences of the country, where distinct dialects are used to depict the fox and his companions.

=== 20th century ===
Igor Stravinsky composed a chamber opera-ballet entitled Renard in 1916, and it was first performed in 1922.

Ladislas Starevich produced The Tale of the Fox in 1937.

The 1962 Oscar-winning documentary Black Fox: The Rise and Fall of Adolf Hitler uses Reynard the Fox as a parallel to the main narrative.

Disney's Robin Hood animated film from 1973 is partly based on Reynard the Fox.

=== 21st century ===
In the SyFy fantasy television show The Magicians (which aired from December 2015 to April 2020) there is a Pagan trickster god played by Mackenzie Astin named Reynard the Fox. SyFy's The Magicians is an adaptation of Lev Grossman's urban fantasy series The Magicians, in which Reynard the Fox appears first as a folk tale and is later revealed to be a minor deity. Fitting within contemporary tropes of trickster gods, Reynard is a major driving force of the narrative in The Magician King, yet remains only referenced in passing for much of the story.

This version of Reynard has little to do with the character as traditionally depicted, his purpose is more in line with that of the gods in Greek literature, with his role being to punish mortals for their hubris. This deviation from the character's actual history is indirectly addressed in the story, in which Reynard himself fabricates light-hearted tales to trick people into underestimating the danger he represents.

== See also ==
- Animal tale
- Coyote (mythology)
- Fabliau
- Fox spirit
- Foxes in popular culture, films and literature
- Kitsune
- Króka-Refs saga
- Maleperduis
- Medieval literature
- Trickster
- Ysengrimus

== Bibliography ==
- Avery, Anne Louise, Reynard The Fox (Oxford: Bodleian Library, 2020).
- Bonafin, Massimo, Le malizie della volpe: Parola letteraria e motivi etnici nel Roman de Renart (Rome: Carocci editore, 2006) (Biblioteca Medievale Saggi). cf. here an abstract of this book & cf. here a review of this book unfortunately not yet translated in English.
- Zebracki, Martin, Het grenzeloze land van Reynaerde [The boundless country of [the Fox] Reynaert]. Geografie 20 (2011: 2), pp. 30–33.
- Johann Heinrich Ramberg (artist), Dietrich Wilhelm Soltau (author), Waltraud Maierhofer (editor): "Reineke Fuchs – Reynard the Fox. 31 Originalzeichnungen u. neu kolorierte Radierungen m. Auszügen aus d. deutschen Übersetzung des Epos im populären Stil v. Soltau | 31 original drawings and newly colored etchings with excerpts from the English translation of the burlesque poem by Soltau." VDG Weimar, Weimar 2016. ISBN 978-3-89739-854-2.
- The most Delectable History of Reynard the Fox. Newly Corrected and Purged from all the Grosenesses both in Phrase and Matter. as also Augmented and Inlarged with Sundry Excellent Moralls and Expositions Vpon Euery Seuerall Chapter. Neuer before this Time Imprinted. , London, 1620. ProQuest.
