= Animal tale =

Short narrative consisting of talking animals

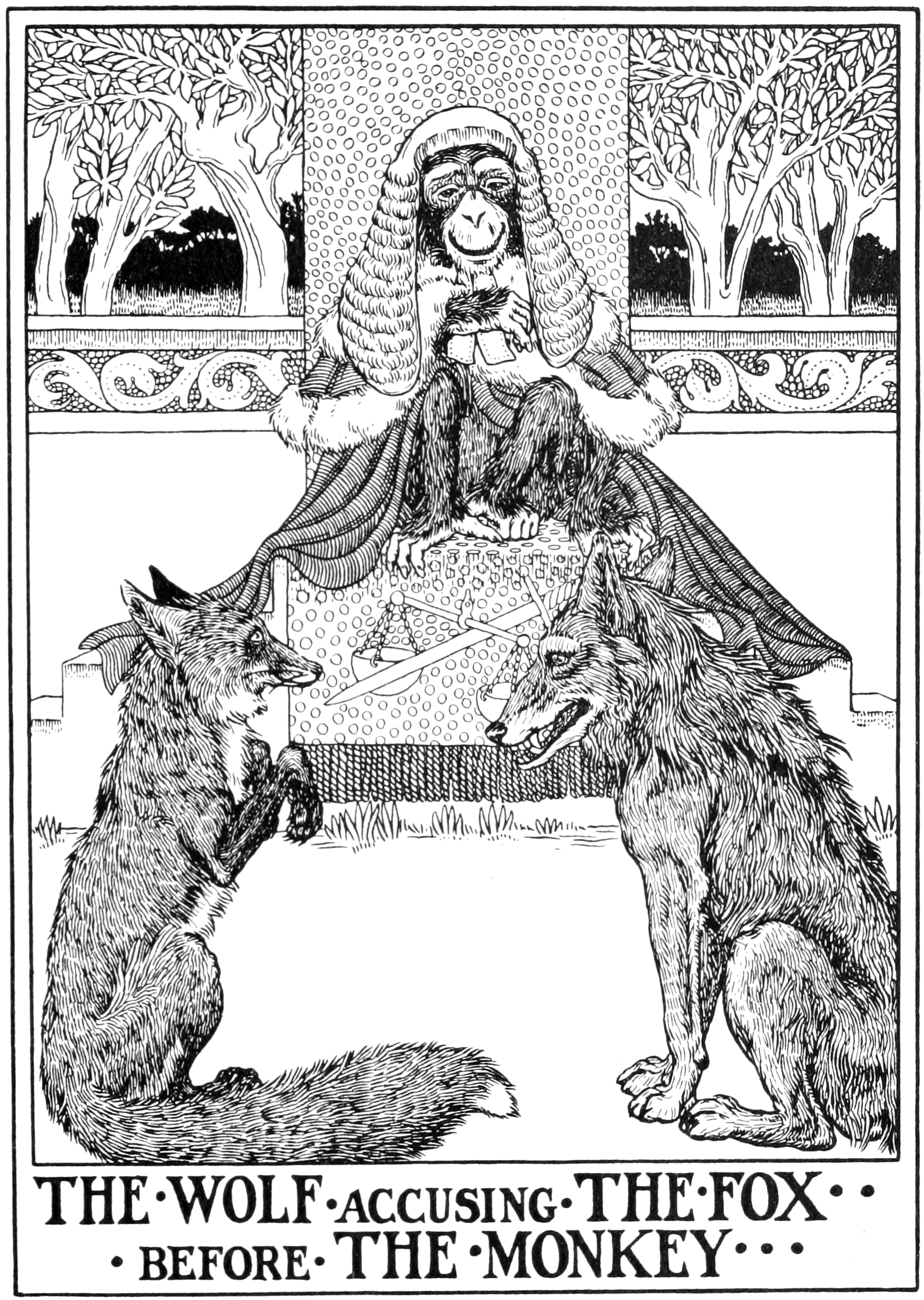
"The Wolf accusing the Fox before the Monkey" from La Fontaine's collection Fables

An animal tale or beast fable generally consists of a short story or poem in which animals talk. They may exhibit other anthropomorphic qualities as well, such as living in a human-like society. It is a traditional form of allegorical writing.

Animal tales can be understood in universal terms of how animal species relate to each other (for example, predators wishing to eat prey), rather than human groups in a specific society. Thus, readers are able to understand characters' motives, even if they do not come from the same cultural background as the author. Animal tales can be appreciated in times and locations far removed from their origins.

== History ==
Important traditions in beast fables are represented by the Panchatantra and Kalila and Dimna (Sanskrit and Arabic originals), Aesop (Greek original), One Thousand and One Nights (Arabian Nights) and separate trickster traditions (West African and Native American). The medieval French cycle of allegories, Roman de Reynart is called a beast-epic, with the recurring figure Reynard the Fox.

Beast fables are commonly translated between languages and often used for educational purposes. For example, Latin versions of Aesop's Fables were standard educational material in the European Middle Ages, over a millennium after they were written. Because of their lack of human social context, animal tales can readily spread from culture to culture. The Uncle Remus stories introduced African-style trickster character Br'er Rabbit to American culture. Br'er Rabbit is smaller and weaker than most characters he encounters, but defeats them with cleverness, similar to tricksters of African folklore, such as Anansi.

== 20th century ==
First published in 1902, the Peter Rabbit books follow various animal characters and are each intended to teach a particular moral to children. The Wind in the Willows (1908) is another British children's novel of the era.

In the 1945 English novel Animal Farm, various political ideologies are personified as animals, such as the Stalinist Napoleon Pig, and the numerous "sheep" that followed his directions without question. Rather than being a story for children, this book was intended for adults attempting to understand the new political landscape during the post-World War II Red Scare.

Post-war English examples of the genre include the "Uncle" series (1964–1973) by J. P. Martin, and the novels of Richard Adams, most notably Watership Down (1972).

== 21st century ==
Many modern books, films, and video games can be considered animal tales. In American cinema, there is also the Academy Award-winning film Zootopia, which serves as a fable about prejudice and stereotypes where the talking animal characters experience both social problems with their species serving as an analogy to racial groups.

The 2017 video game Night in the Woods has been cited as an allegory for becoming an adult, as well as for late-stage capitalism.

Aggretsuko, a 2016 anime, features talking animal characters and examines themes such as misogyny and workplace anxiety.

Cartoons and other media featuring talking animals are central to the furry fandom subculture.
