= Folie à deux (disambiguation) =

Folie à deux (French for 'madness of two') is a rare psychiatric syndrome shared by two people.

Folie à deux may also refer to:

== Literature ==
- "Folie a Deux", a 2013 autobiography by Robert Eringer
- "Folie à Deux", a short story from the 2018 anthology The Unsafe Asylum by Anirudh Kala
- "Folie à Deux", a poem from the 2007 poetry book Harlot by Jill Alexander Essbaum

== Music ==
- Folie à Deux (album), a 2008 album by Fall Out Boy
- "Folie a Deux", a 2005 song by Sezen Aksu off the album Excuse; see Sezen Aksu discography
- "Folie à Deux", a 2024 song from the album Harlequin by Lady Gaga
- "Folie a Deux", a chamber music composition by Emily Doolittle

== Stage and screen ==
- Joker: Folie à Deux, a 2024 sequel to the film Joker
- "Folie à Deux", a 2018 season 3 episode of Chicago Med
- "Folie à Deux" (Elementary), a 2016 season 5 episode of Elementary
- "Folie a Deux" (Law & Order: Criminal Intent), a Law & Order: Criminal Intent season 8 episode
- "Folie à Deux" (The X-Files), a 1998 episode of The X-Files
- Folie a Deux, a 1995 stage play by Stephanie Johnson

== Other uses ==
- Folie à Deux (winery), a Napa Valley, California, winery
- Folie à Deux, a 2018 art exhibition by Felix Bernstein & Gabe Rubin

== See also ==
- Folie (disambiguation)
- Deux (disambiguation)
