= Harlot (disambiguation) =

Harlot is an archaic name for a prostitute.

Harlot may also refer to:

- Harlot (1964 film)
- Harlot (1971 film), pornographic film
- Harlot (poetry collection), 2007 anthology by Jill Alexander Essbaum
- Beast and the Harlot, a song by rock band Avenged Sevenfold
- Hellfire Harlots, a roller derby league based in Nottingham, England
- We Are Harlot, or Harlot, a rock band
- Harlots (TV series), 2017 Hulu series
