= Folly (disambiguation) =

A folly is a decorative building.

Folly most often also refers to:

- Foolishness, the lack of wisdom
- Folly fort, a military fort built on water near a shore

Folly may also refer to:

== Arts and entertainment ==
- Folly (allegory), a common allegorical figure in medieval morality plays and in allegorical artwork through the Renaissance
- Folly (band), a band from Sussex, New Jersey
- Folly, an 1886 statue by Edward Onslow Ford
- Folly, a 1994 novel by Susan Minot
- Folly (magazine), a literary magazine from New Zealand

== Places ==
=== New Zealand ===
- Folly Island, New Zealand, in the Campbell Island group

=== United States ===
- Folly, Virginia, an unincorporated community
- Folly (Staunton, Virginia), a historic plantation house
- Folly Island, a barrier island near Charleston, South Carolina

=== Rivers in England ===
- Folly Brook, Barnet, London
- Folly Brook, a tributary of the River Frome, Bristol
- Folly Brook, a tributary of the River Clun, Shropshire

== Other uses ==
- Tree ring (landscape feature), also once popularly called a folly, a decorative feature of 18th and early 19th century planned landscapes in Britain and Ireland
- Folly (color), a color one-fourth of the way between crimson and rose, closer to crimson than to rose
- Folly (SP-1453), a sailing schooner that served in the United States Navy as a patrol vessel during World War I
- Yoann Folly (born 1985), French-born Togolese football player

== See also ==
- Seward's Folly, another name for the purchase of Alaska
- Folie (disambiguation)
- Follies (disambiguation)
- Foley (disambiguation)
- FoLLI, an international, especially European, learned society
