= Follies (disambiguation) =

Follies or Folies may refer to:

- Folies Bergère, a cabaret music hall in Paris, world renowned between the 1890s and 1920s
- Ziegfeld Follies, a series of extravagant Broadway revues popular between 1907 and 1931
- Follies, a 1971 musical with score by Stephen Sondheim
  - Follies (original Broadway cast recording), a 1971 album containing a recording of the above musical made by its original Broadway cast
- "Follies" (Slow Horses), a 2022 television episode
- Follies (film), a 2025 Canadian sex comedy film co-written, co-produced and directed by Eric K. Boulianne.

== See also ==
- The Will Rogers Follies, a 1991 musical
- Farley's Follies
- Folie (disambiguation)
- Folly (disambiguation)
