= Steve Gong =

British photojournalist (born 1985)

Steve Gong (traditional Chinese: 鞏睿; born June 16, 1985) is a New York-based photojournalist whose work has exposed life in North Korea.

His film, Pyongyang Style, has been widely covered in international media,

The work followed earlier detentions of American journalists in North Korea, later resolved through diplomatic negotiations involving former U.S. President Bill Clinton.

He has also received recognition for his work in Anhui, China, including awards at the 2007 Salmagundi Film Festival, and has traveled to over 58 countries in the course of his photojournalism career.

Gong was born in Beijing, China, raised in Rome, Italy, studied at the University of Virginia, and later obtained an M.A. in Photojournalism and Documentary Photography at the London College of Communication, University of the Arts London.
