= Anirudh Kala =

Indian psychiatrist

Anirudh Kala, is an Indian psychiatrist based in Ludhiana, Punjab, India. He had been an active participant in the Indian Psychiatric Society (IPS) for forty years and had raised awareness about mental health legislation and related issues among Indian psychiatrists. He is clinical director of The Mind Plus, an acute psychiatric care clinic in Ludhiana. Kala is founding president of the Indian Association of Private Psychiatry and founding president of Indo-Pak Punjab Psychiatric Society. The latter is a cross border initiative forging links between mental health professionals of Indian and Pakistani Punjab provinces. Partly based on interactions with Pakistani colleagues and visits to mental health institutes he wrote an anthology of short stories, The Unsafe Asylum: Stories of Partition & Madness. A novel, "Two and a Half Rivers' about the nineteen eighties' militancy in Punjab was published in 2021. A non-fiction book "Most of What You Know About Addiction Is Wrong" meant for common readers and policy makers was published in March 2023 by Speaking Tiger Books.

Kala was invited in 2011 by the Ministry of Health and Family Welfare, Government of India, to be member of an expert group tasked with formulating the first ever Mental Health Policy for the country. The group submitted the policy document to the health minister on 29 September 2014. The policy was launched by the government on the World Mental Health Day on 10 October 2014 to mixed reactions. On 1 February 2014, Kala resigned from the membership of the Indian Psychiatric Society in protest against homophobic statements made by the president of the society at the society's annual conference and subsequent refusal by society to make amends
