= Deux =

Deux means "two" in French, and D'eux means "of them" or "about them" in French.

- 2, the natural number following 1 and preceding 3
  - 2 (disambiguation)
- Folie à deux, a rare psychiatric syndrome

== Geography ==
- Deux Montagnes, French for Two Mountains
  - Deux-Montagnes line, a commuter railway line operated in the Greater Montreal, Quebec, Canada area
  - Deux-Montagnes, Quebec, a municipality in southwestern Quebec, Canada
- Deux-Sèvres, a French département
- Blainville—Deux-Montagnes, a former federal electoral district in Quebec, Canada
- Communes of the Deux-Sèvres department, 305 communes of the Deux-Sèvres département, in France

== Entertainment ==
- D'eux, a 1995 album by Canadian singer Celine Dion
- Deux (band), a South Korean duo band
- Deux-Deux, a fictional character who appeared in The Inspector
- Folie à Deux (album), a 2008 album by American band Fall Out Boy
- La Deux, a Belgian national television channel
- Pas de deux, a duet in which ballet steps are performed together
- Deux Press, an imprint of the manga publisher Aurora Publishing
- Deux, a 1980s French synth pop duo who have released music on the Minimal Wave Records label

== Cinema ==
- Two (2002 film), a French film released as Deux in France
- Two of Us (2019 film), a French film released as Deux in France
- Hot Shots! Part Deux
