= Justine Johnston =

American actress and singer (1921-2006)

- Justine Johnston, circa 1980s
- Born: June 13, 1921; Evanston, Illinois, U.S.
- Died: January 13, 2006 (aged 84); West Hollywood, California, U.S.
- Occupation: Actress
- Years active: 1940–2004

Justine Johnston (June 13, 1921 – January 13, 2006) was an American film, television, and musical theatre actress.

== Life and career ==
Johnston was born in Evanston, Illinois. She was occasionally mistaken for Justine Johnstone, a similarly named silent film actress, who is not her mother and with whom she had no connection. Johnston performed throughout the Mid-Pacific during World War II. She appeared on Broadway in such musicals as the original production of the Tony-winning Follies (by Stephen Sondheim), as well as the American production of Me and My Girl, and a revival of Irene, starring Debbie Reynolds. She played Aunt Pearl in the classic comedy Arthur (1981).

Johnston served on the governing body of the Actors' Equity Association for 39 years. She died of a stroke in West Hollywood, aged 84, in 2006.

== Filmography ==
| Year | Title | Role | Notes |
|---|---|---|---|
| 1972 | Sisters | Elaine D'Anna | Uncredited |
| 1979 | Orphan Train | Mrs. Comstock | TV movie |
| 1980 | Paul's Case | Madame Heinzel | TV movie |
| 1981 | Arthur | Aunt Pearl Bach | |
| 1986 | Nine 1/2 Weeks | Bedding Saleswoman | |
| 1987 | Forever, Lulu | Judith Cabot | |
| 1987 | Fatal Attraction | Real Estate Agent | |
| 1988 | Running on Empty | Librarian | |
| 1992 | Seinfeld | Mrs. Armstrong | Episode: "The Letter" |
| 1996 | Eye for an Eye | Aunt Flo McCann | |
| 1996 | The Drew Carey Show | The Woman | Episode: "Buzz Beer" |
| 1996 | Bogus | Woman in Plane | |
| 1996 | Mr. Rhodes | Hermione Rockwell | Episode: "The Thanksgiving Show" |
| 1998 | Que la lumière soit (aka: Let There Be Light) | La vieille américaine | |
| 1999 | The Duke | Mrs. Puddingforth | |
| 2000 | Joe Gould's Secret | Mrs. Bagly | |
| 2002 | The New Guy | Mrs. Whitman | |
| 2004 | That's So Raven | Mrs. Ferguson | Episode: "Skunk'd", (final appearance) |
