= Two Mountains =

Two Mountains is the English rendering of Deux Montagnes, and can represent

- Two Mountains (electoral district), a former Canadian federal riding containing the municipality of the same name
- Lake of Two Mountains, Lac des Deux Montagnes, lake in the Greater Montreal Area
- Laval—Two Mountains, former Canadian federal riding
- Deux-Montagnes, municipality in southwestern Quebec, Canada, called "Two Mountains" in English, and named after the lake

== See also ==
- Deux Montagnes (disambiguation)
