= London College of Communication =

Constituent college of the University of the Arts London

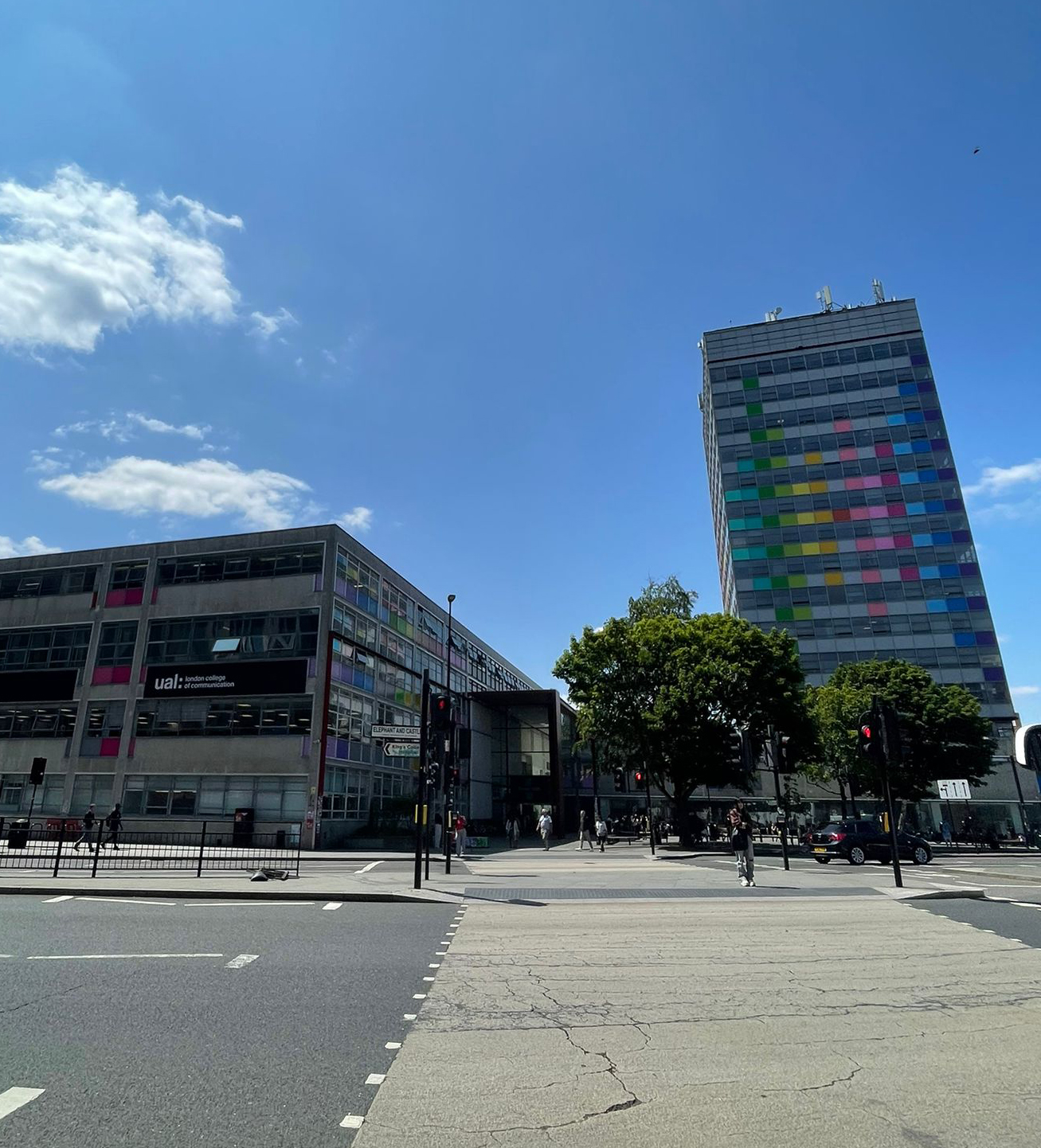
- Established: 1894 (132 years ago)
- Parent institution: University of the Arts London
- Provost: Dr Sam Mejias
- Location: London, United Kingdom; 51°29′40.85″N 0°6′6.77″W
- Campus: Urban: Elephant & Castle
- Website: arts.ac.uk/lcc
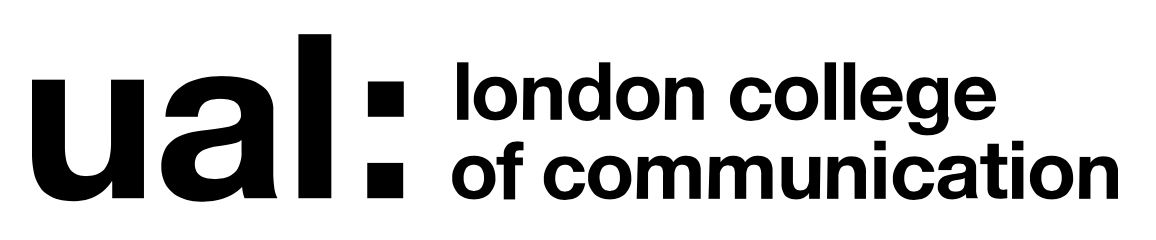

The London College of Communication is a constituent college of the University of the Arts London. Its origins are in education for the printing and retail industries; it now specialises in media-related subjects including advertising, animation, film, graphic design, photography and sound arts.

It has approximately 5,000 students, and offers about sixty courses at undergraduate and postgraduate level. It is organised in three schools: media, design and screen; all are housed in a single building in Elephant and Castle. It received its present name in 2004; it was previously the London School of Printing and Graphic Arts, then the London College of Printing, and briefly the London College of Printing and Distributive Trades.

The top leadership role in the college was previously known as the Pro Vice-Chancellor and Head of College; in 2025, this role was changed to the Provost of London College of Communication instead.

As of September 2026, the current provost is Dr Sam Mejias, who is also the Executive Dean for Impact and Innovation. The Deputy Provost is Steve Cross.

== History ==
The London College of Printing, as London College of Communication was previously known, descended from the St Bride's Foundation Institute Printing School, which was established in November 1894 under the City of London Parochial Charities Act 1883. The Guild and Technical School opened in the Old Daily Mirror building in Clerkenwell in the same year, but moved a year later to Bolt Court, and became the Bolt Court Technical School; it was later renamed the London County Council School of Photoengraving and Lithography.

Annual portfolios of student work were assembled during the years that the printing school was administered by St Bride Foundation. These, and other early documentation, form part of the permanent collections at St Bride Printing Library.

St Bride's came under the control of the London County Council in 1922 and was renamed the London School of Printing and Kindred Trades; in 1949 it was merged with the LCC School of Photoengraving and Lithography, forming the London School of Printing and Graphic Arts. In 1960 this was renamed the London College of Printing. The printing department of the North Western Polytechnic was merged into it in 1969. The London College of Printing became part of the London Institute in 1986.

The Westminster Day Continuation School opened in 1921, and was later renamed the College for Distributive Trades. It too became part of the London Institute in 1986. In 1990 it merged with the London College of Printing to form the London College of Printing and Distributive Trades, which in 2004 was renamed the London College of Communication.

In 2003 the London Institute received Privy Council approval for university status, and in 2004 was renamed University of the Arts London.

== Building and location ==
Since 1962, London College of Communication has been located in the centre of Elephant and Castle. The building expanded in 1973 to include the Design and Management School (now known as the 'Design School’) and in 2003 to accommodate the moving of the School of Media from Back Hill.

The signage in the building was designed by alumni Domenic Lippa and his colleagues at Pentagram. The wayfinding design was a Gold Winner at the 2016 London Design Awards, as well as winning a Wood Pencil for Graphic Design/Wayfinding & Environmental Graphics at the 2016 D&AD Awards.

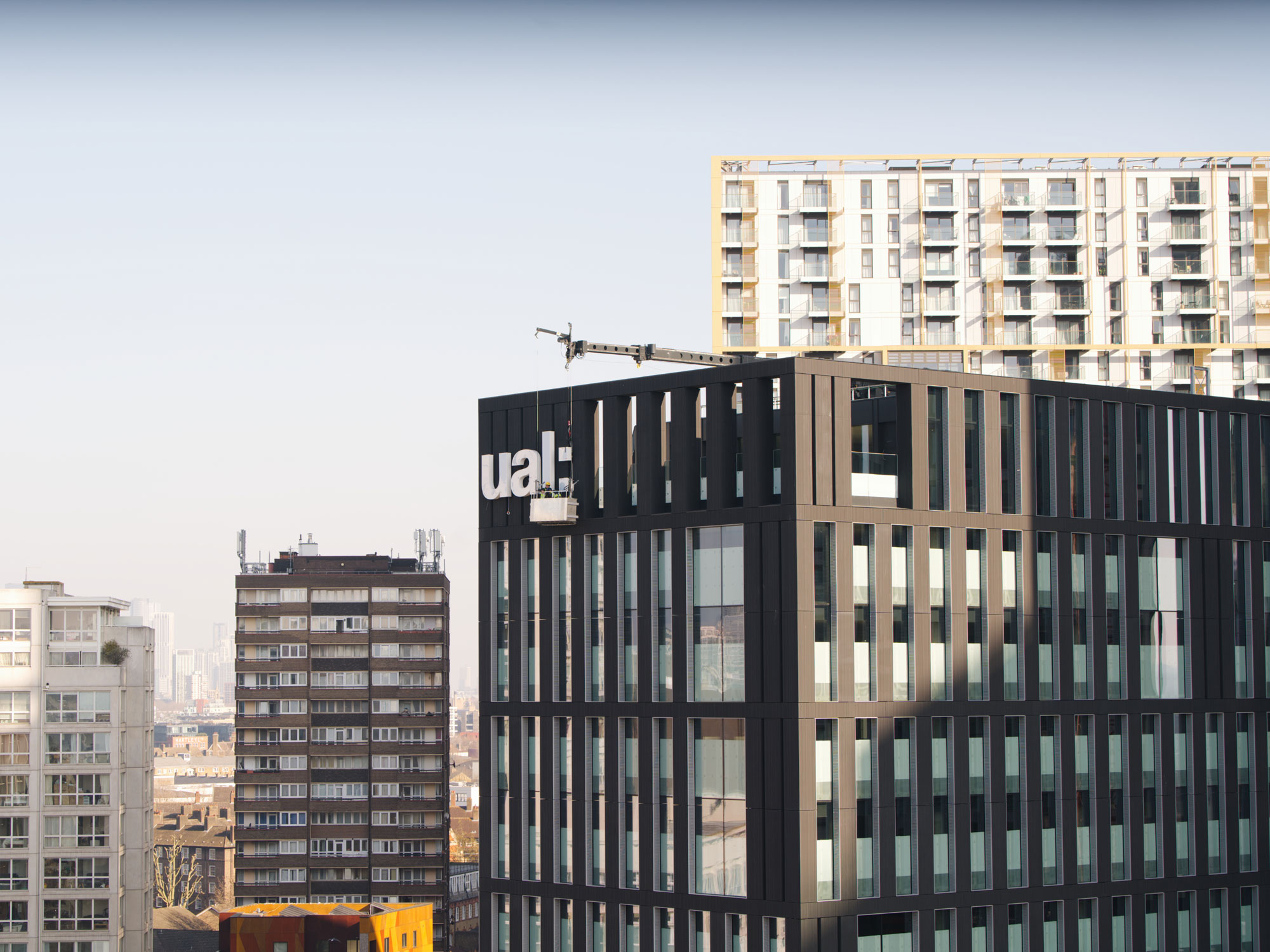
The new London College of Communication site, March 2025.

A new building is currently underway, with the current building due to be closed in 2027 and the new campus opening its doors in September of the same year. Approved by Southwark Council as part of urban development in Elephant & Castle, the building will be part of 3 lots replacing the 1960s shopping mall. The construction is built out by Multiplex, with the new university’s shell and core designed by architecture firm Allies and Morrison and the 45,000 sqm fit-out strategy designed by architecture firm Perkins&Will.

The first two floors of the new building will be open to the public, with a community space for events and student showcases, and will sit alongside new shops, restaurants, rental homes, and the new Elephant & Castle London Underground station entrance. The current building will be redeveloped into almost 500 new homes, retail and leisure, and a cultural centre.

== Education ==
London College of Communication is structured into three schools: Design, Media and Screen. As well as offering undergraduate, postgraduate and research courses, the college also offers a diploma in Professional Studies (DPS). The MPhil and PhD courses at London College of Communication are a part of the University of the Arts London’s Doctoral School, based in High Holborn.

=== Design School ===
The Design School originated from the Department of Design, assembled by William Stobbs during the college’s time as the London School of Printing and Graphic Arts. This department established the first ever undergraduate course in graphic design to exist in Britain.

At the time, the primary focus of the college was printing, with a much smaller focus on design. Staff of the original department included renowned poster designer Tom Eckersley, who later became the head of the department for 20 years, and the designer of the London Underground map, Harry Beck. Today, the Design School has grown into one of the largest departments of the current College. Ian Mclaren and Tony Pritchard’s book, Modernist Graphic Design in Britain 1945–1980 (2024), lists the Design School at London College of Communication as one of the top influential schools for the subject of Design.

Undergraduate and postgraduate courses offered by the Design School come under the following streams: Branding and Design Innovation, Graphic Design Communication, Interaction Design and Visual Communication.

The current Dean of Design is Professor Brian Lucid.

=== Media School ===
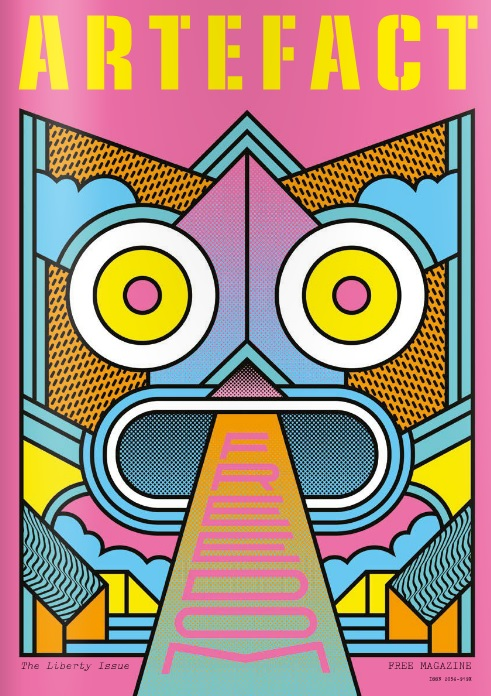
Artefact Magazine, 2015

The Media School moved from Back Hill to the current building in 2003. The first UAL research centre was under the Media School: the Photography and the Archive Research Centre (PARC). Founded by Val Williams, professor of the history and culture of photography at the Media School, the research centre ran until 2023.

Since 2015, the official UAL student publication, Artefact Magazine, has been produced out of the Media School. Other initiatives at the school include the Refugee Journalism Project, which provides support for displaced journalists.

Undergraduate and postgraduate courses offered by the Media School come under the following streams: Communications and Media, Journalism and Publishing, and Photography.

The current Dean of Media is Adrian Crookes.

=== Screen School ===
The Screen School is the most recent school at London College of Communication, and includes a combination of both traditional and emerging disciplines in film, television, animation, games design, virtual reality, and sound arts. The school was officially launched in 2017 with a keynote by Lord David Puttnam.

The school is home to Creative Research into Sound Arts Practice (CRiSAP), one of University of the Arts London’s research centres. Established in 2005, CRiSAP supports artistic research into listening, sound, and the politics of audio cultures.

Undergraduate and postgraduate courses offered by the Screen School come under the following streams: Film and Television, Moving Image and Digital Arts, and Sound and Music. Recent curriculum developments have included new pathways in virtual production, game design, and immersive storytelling.

The current Dean of Screen is Dr Adam Stanović.

== Initiatives and projects ==
The Talent Works initiative runs at both the London College of Communication and Camberwell College of Arts. The initiative has provided over 200 students with paid work for a variety of creative projects at local charities, social enterprises and community groups in the past 7 years.

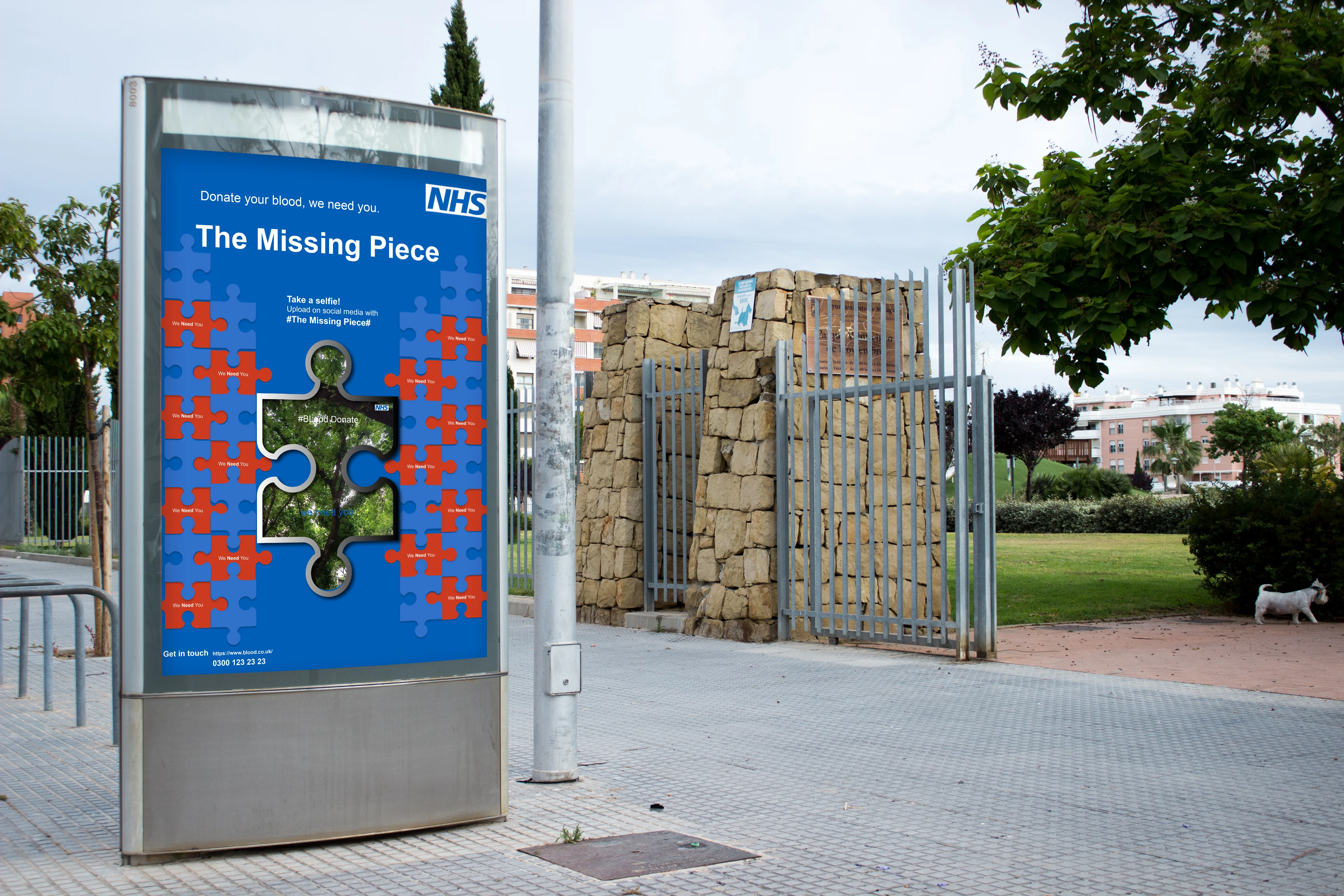
Billboard mockup designed by Anke Chen, Euijin Oh, Sazanias Asrat, Fangyan (Calvin) Wang, Qiaochu (Chloe) Chen, Abdiel Nwachukwu for the NHS England 75th anniversary, 2023.

The Digital Learning Champions initiative selects students annually to work with the Digital Learning team at the college. The cohort of 4 Champions works on 4 individual projects, as well as a joint group project.

The Refugee Journalism Project has been run out of the College’s Journalism and Publishing Department since 2016. The scheme provides support for displaced and exiled journalists and has collaborated with global organisations such as BAFTA, Bloomberg, the UNHCR, the Guardian Foundation, the Greater London Authority, and the Refugee Council.

Other projects have included partnering with NHS England on two campaigns to mark the 75th anniversary of the NHS, designing limited edition Woodland Trust bottles with Belvoir Farm, collaborating with Southwark Playhouse to produce a magazine, and creating fundraising campaigns for the Cinema Museum.

== Publications ==
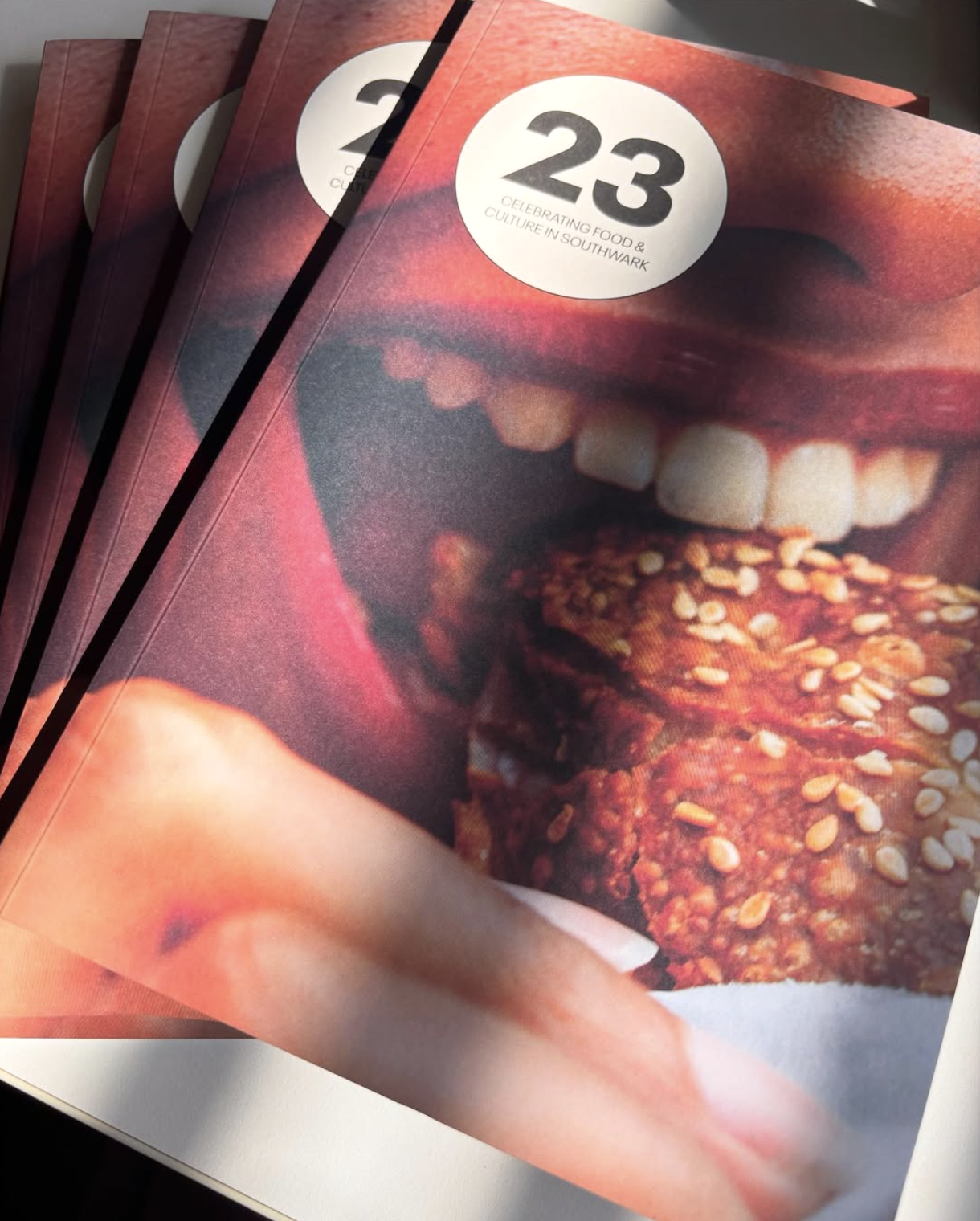
23 Magazine, June 2024.

The college has a termly publication, Artefact Magazine, which is produced by students on the BA and MA Journalism Courses, and is the official university-wide student publication. Launched in 2014, the magazine covers topical issues in the fields of politics, art, creativity and social affairs, and is distributed around the entire university. In 2017, the publication was shortlisted for 'Student Magazine of the Year' for the Stack Awards.

The secondary publication based at the College is 23 Magazine, which covers cultural issues in Southwark and is localised to the College only. Previous issues included a special on food, which featured and reviewed around 100 local restaurants in the area, and an issue in association with the UNHCR, examining the global food crisis. That issue was described as a ‘groundbreaking initiative’ to improve the public’s understanding of poverty, inequity, corporate capture and the health and environmental cost of our food system by Dr Stuart Gillepsie in his book Food Fight (2025).

== Archives, artefacts and collections ==
Several archives are kept at London College of Communication’s campus, including the Zine Collection (which contains over 3000 zines), the Camerawork Archive, the Stanley Kubrick Archive, and more. The Archives and Special Collections Centre, which is based at the campus, holds over 45 archives and collections in total.

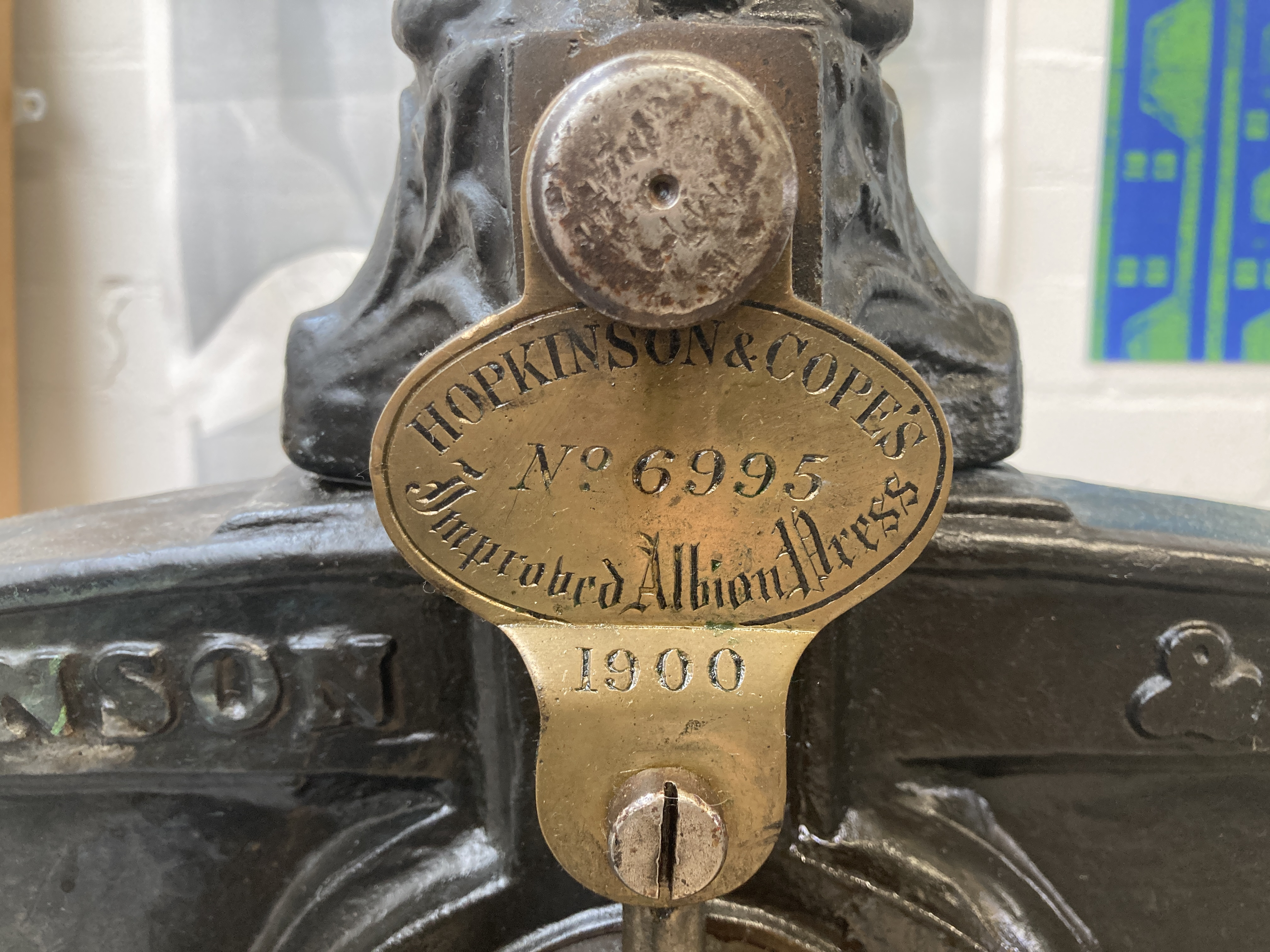
The 20th century Albion press at LCC.

The Stanley Kubrick archive was acquired in 2007, and is stored in a sterile environment in the Archive and Special Collections Centre. The archive receives around 1400–1700 visitors per annum, with the reading room accommodating up to 6 researchers at a time. The Archive has over 800 linear metres of shelving, with 19 categories listed on the online catalogue.

Artefacts at the college include a traditional Heidelberg letterpress and several relief printing presses which are the oldest mechanical machines at the university, including an Albion press dating back to 1900.

== Student Life ==
Arts SU, the Students' Union of UAL, has an office based on the campus, as well as a gallery space for student-led exhibitions and events. In addition, the Darkroom Bar, the only student union bar available at UAL, is located at the college. The union's elected Sabbatical officer team of six includes a specific College Officer for London College of Communication, as well as six elected School Reps (2 per School).

The Magazine Publishing Society is primarily based at LCC.

== Exhibitions and events ==
Outside of the annual undergraduate and postgraduate degree show exhibitions and Unfolding Narratives (an annual exhibition of works by the postgraduate researchers), past exhibitions have included Design Action for London Design Festival in 2020.

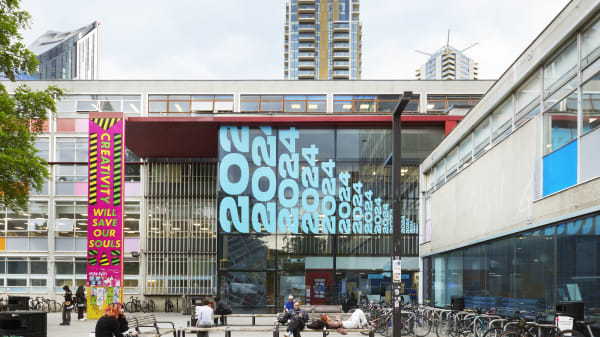
The plinth by Fandangoe Kid on display outside of the College in 2024.

Other displays have included alumni collaboration – one such example was a public plinth designed by alumni and internationally acclaimed artist Annie Nicholson, who works under the name Fandangoe Kid. Created to celebrate 125 years of the college’s contributions to the London art scene, the plinth featured Nicholson’s trademark bright colours and bold typography, and was made in collaboration with both students and the local community. The design included the phrases 'Creativity will save our souls' and 'Open minds change lives', and was in place from March 2020 until June 2025.

Notable events include several publishing conferences hosted by the MA Publishing course, various talks and lectures with a range of speakers, including actor Toby Jones and photographer Diana Markosian, and the British Film Institute’s Charles Chaplin Conference in 2005. This event was held in collaboration with the University of Southampton, and coincided with the establishment of the British Film Institute's Charlie Chaplin Research Programme.

== Cutbacks and closures ==
LCC had student protests and sit-ins in November 2009, as students expressed anger over proposed course closures and staff redundancies. About 100 students tried to occupy the office of Sandra Kemp, the head of the college at that time, in protest over the lack of supervision for dissertations. Students later occupied a lecture theatre and private security guards tried to remove protesting students. This failed when a member of academic staff questioned their right to touch the students and police were summoned who prevailed upon the protesters to leave the building. Several students faced disciplinary action, including suspension.

The director of the university's course in public relations resigned over the proposed cutbacks, saying that there weren't enough staff. Much of the teaching was then supplied by sessional lecturers on short-term contracts. A member of the teaching staff said that sackings resulted in cancelled lectures and students left without dissertation supervisors.

In 2011 an inquiry by the Quality Assurance Agency into restructuring at the LCC found standards were so badly affected by course closures that the marks of some students were raised to compensate. The report followed complaints by students relating to the restructuring, including claims that quality had been 'severely compromised' and that those studying were not informed of the plans before enrolment. The investigation was the first of its kind and is the QAA's revised “whistleblower” process for investigating concerns about academic standards and quality. The decision to investigate the complaints followed the closure of 16 courses and 26 full-time redundancies.

The college faced several building closures during the COVID-19 pandemic, due to the government-mandated lockdowns, with students switching to online learning. The university reopened their buildings in line with governmental guidelines, with their public degree shows restarting in 2022.

== People ==
Notable staff include Tom Eckersley, known as the master of poster as well as the founder of the UK’s very first undergraduate graphic design course, the London Underground tube map designer Harry Beck, design education innovator Ian Noble, editor and previous Special Projects and Cultural Director of Magnum Photos Brigitte Lardinois, and renowned photojournalist and author, Paul Lowe.

High-profile students have included the Bartle Bogle Hegarty advertising agency co-founder Sir John Hegarty (who is also a current UAL ambassador), cartoonist and illustrator Ralph Steadman, Dazed magazine founders Rankin Waddell and Jefferson Hack (who founded the magazine in 1991 during their time at the College), magCulture founder Jeremy Leslie, graphic designer Neville Brody, and advertising executive and art collector Charles Saatchi.
