= Folly (magazine) =

Literary magazine

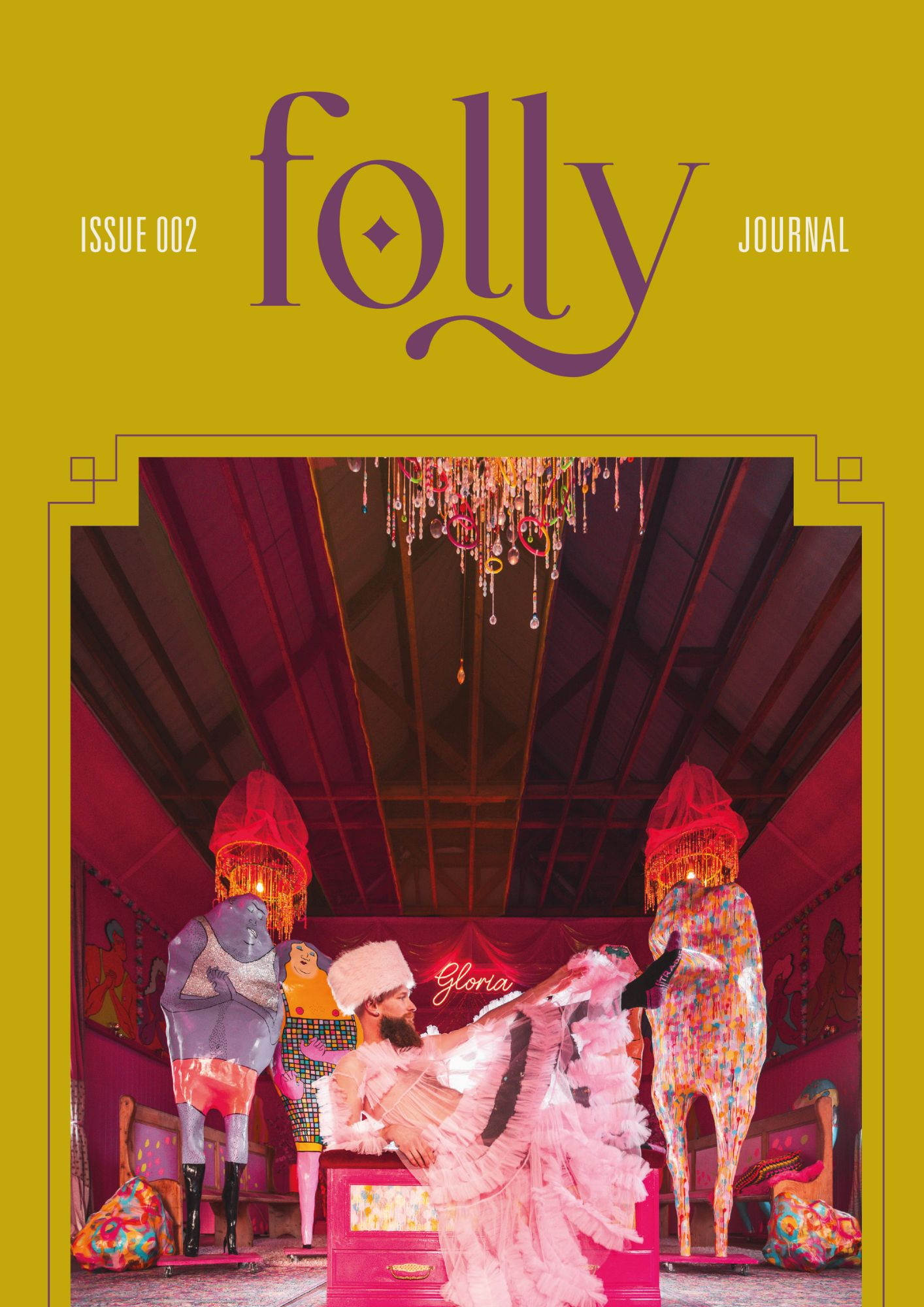
- Cover of Folly issue 002
- Editor: Emily Makere Broadmore
- Categories: Literary magazine
- Frequency: Annual
- Format: Approximately A4 size
- Circulation: 1200
- Publisher: Emily Broadmore
- Founder: Emily Broadmore; Dana Turner; Tiana Jones
- Founded: 2022
- First issue: November 2023
- Country: New Zealand
- Based in: Wellington
- Language: English
- Website: follyjournal.com

Folly is a literary magazine edited from New Zealand, established in 2022. Its founder and editor is Emily Makere Broadmore.

Published annually in November, Folly is a print-only anthology of short stories, non-fiction, poetry and art that aims to provide a platform for emerging writers. It accepts unsolicited contributions, allows writers to use pseudonyms and provides prize money for successful submissions.

== History ==
Folly was conceived in 2022 when founding editor Emily Maker Broadmore had spent time in New York reading literary journals and realised there were not similar publications in New Zealand, and as a writer had struggled to find suitable channels to publish her work. She shared the idea with co-founders Dana Turner (art direction) and Tiana Jones (marketing), and by February 2023 made a call for submissions, receiving 1400 submissions for the first edition; of which 28 were published.

Two journals have now been published, with a third set for publication in November 2025. Folly only publishes a print edition and is stocked in New Zealand in some independent bookstores such as Unity Books, Relay airport stores, and some hotels. It is distributed internationally through magCulture in London and other independent retailers, and is available to order online.

The first issue of Folly attracted some controversy in New Zealand literary circles after the invitation to a fundraiser for the magazine, which included readings in a local sauna, claimed it was "a far cry from the usual dry and elite affairs". Prominent New Zealand poet, writer and editor Ashleigh Young wrote on social media that it was "a strange way to invite people to a book launch", and award-winning poet James Hamel told news media website The Spinoff that the "schtick carelessly steps on a whole lot of people who have spent years in the NZ lit scene". In response, Broadmore said the criticism she and her co-founders faced felt like people were questioning what right and ability the three women founders possessed to launch a literary journal.

== Scope and content ==
Folly was conceived as a "lightish, ornamental and accessible" publication, and not aimed for high-brow tastes. Although the founding editor says themes emerge from the work submitted from contributors, the first edition featured content of a sexual theme while the second edition had a "noir and melancholy" feel.

Folly aims to publish writers who would not normally consider themselves writers or who have not been published before, and provides mentoring and assistance to develop work to a publishable standard. Broadmore says about half the submissions came from overseas writers, giving the journal an international perspective.

Sexually-themed content is prevalent across the published issues, such as accounts of an eight-orgasm experience enjoyed by a young woman writer and her older male lover, and the pre-social media dating escapades between journalist Emma Gilkison and New Zealand broadcaster Guyon Espiner.

Social commentary also features with topics such as social displacement, Māori identity, New Zealand’s criminal underworld and filmmaking with Dame Gaylene Preston.

== Reception ==
Steve Braunias, the literary editor for New Zealand current affairs website Newsroom, described Folly as "a strange new journal with short fiction, short essays and short poems, aimed at people with short attention spans … which has some of the best New Zealand writing I've read all year".

The editor at short fiction magazine After Dinner Conversation, Kolby Granville, said Folly is "a welcome addition to the literary landscape, and a wonderful addition to New Zealand's cultural scene", and queer quarterly magazine Fruitslice reviewed Folly as an "eyebrow-raising, whip-smart rollercoaster of a read".

Chill Subs, a free searchable database of opportunities for writers, ranked Folly thirteenth in their survey 'Where The Cool Kids Are Submitting Their Writing These Days', and chose Folly as the first of five winners to their inaugural Literary Incubator in September 2025, providing a $1000 grant and support for the journal to work towards sustainability.

== Whitcoulls removal ==
In November 2025, New Zealand's largest bookstore chain, Whitcoulls, removed the third issue of Folly from the shelves of its 47 stores, citing content it deemed offensive and incompatible with the retailer's family-friendly brand identity. Staff at multiple stores reported anonymously that the stock was removed within hours of arriving in store.

Copies were initially placed behind the counter and made available only on request. However, an internal company email subsequently obtained by The Post directed staff not to sell the journal under any circumstances and to return all remaining stock to the distributor. Approximately 180 copies held across Whitcoulls stores were returned to the supplier, Are Direct.

David Norman, the group managing director of James Pascoe Group — owner of Whitcoulls — stated that repeated use of strong language in the issue had led to its removal. The issue included an essay by Australian bestselling author Nikki Gemmell exploring the reclamation of vulgar language by young women, and a poem by Australian writer Rachel Apps containing profanity on the inner cover page.

Founder and editor Emily Broadmore appeared on Newstalk ZB's Heather du Plessis-Allan Drive programme, describing the removal as censorship and noting that similar content was present in other titles stocked by Whitcoulls. Broadmore subsequently published an opinion piece in the Sunday Star-Times arguing that the removal raised questions about how major retailers treat independent publishers in New Zealand's publishing sector. The story was also covered by RNZ and attracted commentary from political blog Kiwiblog, which characterised the decision as "overly puritanical". UK magazine industry publication magCulture also covered the incident.

Following the ban and associated media coverage, the third issue of Folly sold out entirely.

== Other activities ==
Folly is published in partnership with the Wellington Writers' Studio, a venture also created by Emily Broadmore located in Cuba Street, an area known for its arts and cultural significance. As of 2023, 22 writers ranging from commercially successful writers to as-yet-unpublished authors have signed up to membership of the studio.

To provide further revenue to support Folly, promotional bathrobes, phone chains and handmade poetry books have been available to purchase since the launch of the journal.
