= Folie =

Folie or Folies may refer to:

- Folies Bergère, a cabaret music hall in Paris
- Folies, a commune in the Somme département in the Picardie region of France
- La Folie, a commune in the Basse-Normandie region of northern France
- La Folie (album), a 1981 album by The Stranglers

== See also ==
- Folie à deux (disambiguation)
- Folly (disambiguation)
- Follies (disambiguation)
- Foley (disambiguation)
- Foly, a surname
