= Follies =

1971 musical by Stephen Sondheim

- Original Broadway windowcard with artwork by David Edward Byrd
- Music: Stephen Sondheim
- Lyrics: Stephen Sondheim
- Book: James Goldman
- Productions: 1971 Broadway; 1972 Los Angeles; 1985 Lincoln Center concert; 1987 West End; 2001 Broadway revival; 2002 Los Angeles; 2002 West End revival; 2007 New York City Center concert; 2011 Washington, D.C.; 2011 Broadway revival; 2012 Los Angeles; 2012 Madrid; 2017 London revival
- Awards: 1971 – New York Drama Critics Award for Best Musical; 1972 – Tony Award for Best Score; 1971 – Drama Desk Award for Outstanding Music; 1971 – Drama Desk Award for Outstanding Lyrics; 1987 – Laurence Olivier Award for Musical of the Year; 2012 – Drama Desk Award for Outstanding Revival of a Musical; 2018 – Laurence Olivier Award for Best Musical Revival

Follies is a musical with music and lyrics by Stephen Sondheim and a book by James Goldman.

The plot centers on a crumbling Broadway theater, now scheduled for demolition, previously home to a musical revue (based on the Ziegfeld Follies). The evening follows a reunion of the Weismann Girls who performed during the interwar period. Several of the former showgirls perform their old numbers, often accompanied by the ghosts of their younger selves. The score offers a pastiche of 1920s and 1930s musical styles, evoking a nostalgic tone.

The original Broadway production, directed by Harold Prince and Michael Bennett, with choreography by Bennett, opened April 4, 1971. The musical was nominated for 11 Tony Awards and won seven at the 26th Tony Awards. The original production, among the most costly on Broadway, ran for over 500 performances but ultimately lost its entire investment. The musical has had a number of major revivals, and several of its songs have become standards, including "Broadway Baby", "I'm Still Here", "Too Many Mornings", "Could I Leave You?", and "Losing My Mind".

== Background ==
After the failure of Do I Hear a Waltz? (1965), for which he had written the lyrics to Richard Rodgers's music, Stephen Sondheim decided that he would henceforth work only on projects where he could write both the music and lyrics himself. He asked author and playwright James Goldman to join him as bookwriter for a new musical. Inspired by a New York Times article about a gathering of former Ziegfeld Girls, they decided upon a story about ex-showgirls.

Originally titled The Girls Upstairs, the musical was to be produced by David Merrick and Leland Hayward in late 1967, but the plans ultimately fell through, and Stuart Ostrow became the producer, with Joseph Hardy as director. These plans also did not work out, and finally Harold Prince, who had worked previously with Sondheim, became the producer and director. He had agreed to work on The Girls Upstairs if Sondheim agreed to work on Company; Michael Bennett, the young choreographer of Company, was also brought onto the project. It was Prince who changed the title to Follies; he was "intrigued by the psychology of a reunion of old chorus dancers and loved the play on the word 'follies'".

== Plot ==
In 1971, on the soon-to-be-demolished stage of the Weismann Theatre, a reunion is being held to honor the Weismann's Follies shows past and the chorus girls who performed there every year between the two world wars. The once resplendent theater is now little but planks and scaffolding ("Prologue"/"Overture"). As the ghosts of the young showgirls slowly drift through the theater, a majordomo enters with his entourage of waiters and waitresses. They pass through the spectral showgirls without seeing them.

Sally Durant Plummer, "blond, petite, sweet-faced" and at 49 "still remarkably like the girl she was thirty years ago", a former Weismann girl, is the first guest to arrive, and her ghostly youthful counterpart moves towards her. Phyllis Rogers Stone, a stylish and elegant woman, arrives with her husband Ben, a renowned philanthropist and politician. As their younger counterparts approach them, Phyllis comments to Ben about their past. He feigns a lack of interest; there is an underlying tension in their relationship. As more guests arrive, Sally's husband, Buddy, enters. He is a salesman, in his early 50s, appealing and lively, whose smiles cover inner disappointment.

Finally, Weismann enters to greet his guests. Roscoe, the old master of ceremonies, introduces the former showgirls ("Beautiful Girls"). Former Weismann performers at the reunion include Max and Stella Deems, who lost their radio jobs and became store owners in Miami; Solange La Fitte, a coquette, who is vibrant and flirtatious even at 66; Hattie Walker, who has outlived five younger husbands; Vincent and Vanessa, former dancers who now own an Arthur Murray franchise; Heidi Schiller, for whom Franz Lehár once wrote a waltz ("or was it Oscar Straus?" Facts never interest her; what matters is the song!); and Carlotta Campion, a film star who has embraced life and benefited from every experience.

As the guests reminisce, the stories of Ben, Phyllis, Buddy, and Sally unfold. Phyllis and Sally were roommates while in the Follies, and Ben and Buddy were best friends at school in New York. When Sally sees Ben, her former lover, she greets him self-consciously ("Don't Look at Me"). Buddy and Phyllis join their spouses and the foursome reminisces about the old days of their courtship and the theater, their memories vividly coming to life in the apparitions of their young counterparts ("Waiting For The Girls Upstairs"). Each of the four is shaken at the realization of how life has changed them. Elsewhere, Willy Wheeler (portly, in his sixties) cartwheels for a photographer. Emily and Theodore Whitman, ex-vaudevillians in their seventies, perform an old routine ("The Rain on the Roof"). Solange proves she is still fashionable at what she claims is 66 ("Ah, Paris!"), and Hattie Walker performs her old showstopping number ("Broadway Baby").

Buddy warns Phyllis that Sally is still in love with Ben, and she is shaken by how the past threatens to repeat itself. Sally is awed by Ben's apparently glamorous life, but Ben wonders if he made the right choices and considers how things might have been ("The Road You Didn't Take"). Sally tells Ben how her days have been spent with Buddy, trying to convince him (and herself) that she is happily married. ("In Buddy's Eyes"). However, it is clear that Sally is still in love with Ben – even though their affair ended badly when Ben decided to marry Phyllis. She shakes loose from the memory and begins to dance with Ben, who is touched by the memory of the Sally he once cast aside.

Phyllis interrupts this tender moment and has a biting encounter with Sally. Before she has a chance to really let loose, they are both called on to participate in another performance – Stella Deems gets Sally, Phyllis, Emily, Hattie, and some others to perform an old number ("Who's That Woman?"), as they are mirrored by their younger selves. Afterward, Phyllis and Ben angrily discuss their lives and relationship, which has become numb and emotionless. Sally is bitter, having never been happy with Buddy, although he has always adored her. She accuses him of having affairs while he is on the road, and he admits he has a steady girlfriend, Margie, in another town, but always returns home. Carlotta amuses a throng of admirers with a tale of how her dramatic solo was cut from the Follies because the audience found it humorous, transforming it as she sings it into an anthem-like toast to her own hard-won survival ("I'm Still Here").

Ben confides to Sally that his life is empty. She yearns for him to hold her, but young Sally slips between them and the three move together ("Too Many Mornings"). Ben, caught in the passion of memories, kisses Sally as Buddy watches from the shadows. Sally thinks this is a sign that the two will finally get married, and Ben is about to protest until Sally interrupts him with a kiss and runs off to gather her things, thinking that the two will leave together. Buddy leaves the shadows furious, and fantasizes about the girl he should have married, Margie, who loves him and makes him feel like "a somebody", but bitterly concludes he does not love her back ("The Right Girl"). He tells Sally that he's done, but she is lost in a fantasy world and tells him that Ben has asked her to marry him. Buddy tells her she must be either crazy or drunk, but he's already supported Sally through rehab clinics and mental hospitals and cannot take any more. Ben drunkenly propositions Carlotta, with whom he once had a fling, but she has a young lover and coolly turns him down. Heidi Schiller, joined by her younger counterpart, performs "One More Kiss", her aged voice a stark contrast to the sparkling coloratura of her younger self. Phyllis kisses a waiter and confesses to him that she had always wanted a son. She then tells Ben that their marriage can't continue the way it has been. Ben replies by saying that he wants a divorce, and Phyllis assumes the request is due to his love for Sally. Ben denies this, but still wants Phyllis out of his life. Angry and hurt, Phyllis considers whether to grant his request ("Could I Leave You?").

Phyllis begins wondering at her younger self, who worked so hard to become the socialite that Ben needed. Ben yells at his younger self for not appreciating all the work that Phyllis did. Both Buddys enter to confront the Bens about how they stole Sally. Sally and her younger self enter and Ben firmly tells Sally that he never loved her. All the voices begin speaking and yelling at each other. Suddenly, at the peak of madness and confusion, the couples are engulfed by their follies, which transform the rundown theater into a fantastical "Loveland", an extravaganza even more grand and opulent than the gaudiest Weismann confection: "the place where lovers are always young and beautiful, and everyone lives only for love". Sally, Phyllis, Ben, and Buddy show their "real and emotional lives" in "a sort of group nervous breakdown".

What follows is a series of musical numbers performed by the principal characters, each exploring their biggest desires. The two younger couples sing in a counterpoint of their hopes for the future ("You're Gonna Love Tomorrow/Love Will See Us Through"). Buddy then appears, dressed in "plaid baggy pants, garish jacket, and a shiny derby hat", and performs a high-energy vaudeville routine depicting how he is caught between his love for Sally and Margie's love for him ("The God-Why-Don't-You-Love-Me Blues"). Sally appears next, dressed as a torch singer, singing of her passion for Ben from the past – and her obsession with him now ("Losing My Mind"). In a jazzy dance number, accompanied by a squadron of chorus boys, Phyllis reflects on the two sides of her personality, one naive and passionate and the other jaded and sophisticated and her desire to combine them ("The Story of Lucy and Jessie"). Resplendent in top hat and tails, Ben begins to offer his devil-may-care philosophy ("Live, Laugh, Love"), but stumbles and anxiously calls to the conductor for the lyrics, as he frantically tries to keep going. Ben becomes frenzied, while the dancing ensemble continues as if nothing was wrong. Amidst a deafening discord, Ben screams at all the figures from his past and collapses as he cries out for Phyllis.

"Loveland" has dissolved back into the reality of the crumbling and half-demolished theater; dawn is approaching. Ben admits to Phyllis his admiration for her, and Phyllis shushes him and helps Ben regain his dignity before they leave. After exiting, Buddy escorts the emotionally devastated Sally back to their hotel with the promise to work things out later. Their ghostly younger selves appear, watching them go. The younger Ben and Buddy softly call to their "girls upstairs", and the Follies end.

== Songs ==
Songs cut before the Broadway premiere include "All Things Bright and Beautiful", "That Old Piano Roll Rag" (used in the prologue and overture), "Can That Boy Foxtrot!", "Who Could Be Blue?" / "Little White House", "It Wasn't Meant to Happen", "Pleasant Little Kingdom", "The World's Full of Girls", "Bring On The Girls", and "Uptown Downtown".

The song list as initially produced on Broadway in 1971:

- "Prologue" – Orchestra
- "Overture" – Orchestra
- "Beautiful Girls" – Roscoe and Company
- "Don't Look at Me" – Sally and Ben
- "Waiting for the Girls Upstairs" – Ben, Sally, Phyllis and Buddy, Young Ben, Young Sally, Young Phyllis and Young Buddy
- "Montage" ("Rain on the Roof"/"Ah, Paris!"/"Broadway Baby (song)") – Emily, Theodore, Solange, and Hattie
- "The Road You Didn't Take" – Ben
- "Bolero d'Amour" – Danced by Vincent and Vanessa ≠≠
- "In Buddy's Eyes" – Sally
- "Who's That Woman?" – Stella and Company
- "I'm Still Here" – Carlotta
- "Too Many Mornings" – Ben and Sally
- "The Right Girl" – Buddy
- "One More Kiss" – Heidi and Young Heidi
- "Could I Leave You?" – Phyllis
- "Loveland" – Company
- "You're Gonna Love Tomorrow" / "Love Will See Us Through" – Young Ben, Young Sally, Young Phyllis and Young Buddy
- "The God-Why-Don't-You-Love-Me Blues" – Buddy, "Margie", "Sally"
- "Losing My Mind" – Sally
- "The Story of Lucy and Jessie" – Phyllis and backup male dancers ≠
- "Live, Laugh, Love" – Ben and Company
- "Chaos" – Ben and Company
- "Finale" – Young Buddy and Young Ben

≠ Some productions substitute "Ah, but Underneath" when the actress portraying Phyllis is not primarily a dancer. ≠≠ Omitted from some productions

The musical numbers "Ah, but Underneath" (replacing "The Story of Lucy and Jessie"), "Country House" (replacing "The Road You Didn't Take"), "Make the Most of Your Music" (replacing "Live, Laugh, Love"), "Social Dancing", and an alternate version of "Loveland" have been incorporated across various productions.

== Analysis ==
Hal Prince said: "Follies examines obsessive behavior, neurosis and self-indulgence more microscopically than anything I know of." Bernadette Peters quoted Sondheim on the character of "Sally": "He said early on that [Sally] is off-balance, to put it mildly. He thinks she's very neurotic, and she is very neurotic, so he said to me 'Congratulations. She's crazy.'" Martin Gottfried wrote: "The concept behind Follies is theatre nostalgia, representing the rose-colored glasses through which we face the fact of age ... the show is conceived in ghostliness. At its very start, ghosts of Follies showgirls stalk the stage, mythic giants in winged, feathered, black and white opulence. Similarly, ghosts of the Twenties shows slip through the evening as the characters try desperately to regain their youth through re-creations of their performances and inane theatre sentiments of their past."

Joanne Gordon, author and chair and artistic director, Theatre, at California State University, Long Beach, wrote "Follies is in part an affectionate look at the American musical theatre between the two World Wars and provides Sondheim with an opportunity to use the traditional conventions of the genre to reveal the hollowness and falsity of his characters' dreams and illusions. The emotional high generated by the reunion of the Follies girls ultimately gives way to anger, disappointment, and weary resignation to reality." Follies contains two scores: the Follies pastiche numbers and the book numbers. Some of the Follies numbers imitate the style of particular composers of the early 20th century: "Losing My Mind" is in the style of a George Gershwin ballad "The Man I Love". Sondheim noted that the song "The God-Why-Don't-You-Love-Me Blues" is "another generic pastiche: vaudeville music for chases and low comics, but with a patter lyric... I tried to give it the sardonic knowingness of Lorenz Hart or Frank Loesser."

"Loveland", the final musical sequence, (that "consumed the last half-hour of the original" production) is akin to an imaginary 1941 Ziegfeld Follies sequence, with Sally, Phyllis, Ben and Buddy performing "like comics and torch singers from a Broadway of yore." "Loveland" features a string of vaudeville-style numbers, reflecting the leading characters' emotional problems, before returning to the theater for the end of the reunion party. The four characters are "whisked into a dream show in which each acts out his or her own principal 'folly'".

== Versions ==
Goldman continued to revise the book of the musical right up to his death, which occurred shortly before the 1998 Paper Mill Playhouse production. Sondheim, too, has added and removed songs that he judged to be problematic in various productions. Ted Chapin, who worked on the original 1971 production and wrote a book about the process in 2003, explains: "Today, Follies is rarely performed twice in exactly the same version. James Goldman's widow made the observation that the show has morphed throughout its entire life ... The London production had new songs and dialogue. The Paper Mill Playhouse production used some elements from London but stayed close to the original. The 2001 Roundabout Broadway revival, the first major production following Goldman's death in 1998, was again a combination of previous versions."

Major changes were made for the original production in London, which attempted to establish a lighter tone and favored a happier ending than the original Broadway production. According to Joanne Gordon, "When Follies opened in London ... it had an entirely different, and significantly more optimistic, tone. Goldman's revised book offered some small improvements over the original."

According to Sondheim, producer Cameron Mackintosh asked for changes for the 1987 London production. "I was reluctantly happy to comply, my only serious balk being at his request that I cut "The Road You Didn't Take" ... I saw no reason not to try new things, knowing we could always revert to the original (which we eventually did). The net result was four new songs ... For reasons which I've forgotten, I rewrote "Loveland" for the London production. There were only four showgirls in this version, and each one carried a shepherd's crook with a letter of the alphabet on it."

The musical was written in one act, and the original director, Prince, did not want an intermission, while the co-director, Bennett, wanted two acts. It originally was performed in one act. The 1987 West End, 2005 Barrington Stage Company, the 2001 Broadway revival and Kennedy Center 2011 productions were performed in two acts. However, the August 23, 2011, Broadway preview performance was performed without an intermission. By the time the 2011 Broadway revival opened, it was performed with an intermission in two acts. The 2017 National Theatre production was performed without an interval, along with largely returning to the 1971 book. As with previous productions, however, the production's book was unique to this iteration as well.

== Productions ==
=== 1971 original Broadway ===
For its pre-Broadway tryout at the Colonial Theatre in Boston, Follies began previews on February 20, running February 24 through March 20, 1971.

Model of set design by Boris Aronson

Follies premiered on Broadway on April 4, 1971, at the Winter Garden Theatre. It was directed by Harold Prince and Michael Bennett, with choreography by Bennett, scenic design by Boris Aronson, costumes by Florence Klotz, and lighting by Tharon Musser. It starred Alexis Smith (Phyllis), John McMartin (Ben), Dorothy Collins (Sally), Gene Nelson (Buddy), along with several veterans of the Broadway and vaudeville stage. The supporting role of Carlotta was created by Yvonne De Carlo and usually is given to a well-known veteran performer who can belt out a song. Other notable performers in the original productions were Fifi D'Orsay as Solange LaFitte, Justine Johnston as Heidi Schiller, Mary McCarty as Stella Deems, Arnold Moss as Dimitri Weismann, Ethel Shutta as Hattie Walker, and Marcie Stringer and Charles Welch as Emily and Theodore Whitman.

The show closed on July 1, 1972, after 522 performances and 12 previews. According to Variety, the production was a "total financial failure, with a cumulative loss of $792,000." Prince planned to present the musical on the West Coast and then on a national tour. However, the show did not do well in its Los Angeles engagement and plans for a tour ended.

Frank Rich, for many years the chief drama critic for The New York Times, had first garnered attention, while an undergraduate at Harvard University, with a lengthy essay for the Harvard Crimson about the show, which he had seen during its pre-Broadway run in Boston. He predicted that the show eventually would achieve recognition as a Broadway classic. Rich later wrote that audiences at the original production were baffled and restless.

For commercial reasons, the cast album was cut from two LPs to one early in production. Most songs were therefore heavily abridged and several were left entirely unrecorded. According to Craig Zadan, "It's generally felt that ... Prince made a mistake by giving the recording rights of Follies to Capitol Records, which in order to squeeze the unusually long score onto one disc, mutilated the songs by condensing some and omitting others." Chapin confirms this: "Alas ... final word came from Capitol that they would not go for two records ... [Dick Jones] now had to propose cuts throughout the score in consultation with Steve." "One More Kiss" was omitted from the final release but was restored for CD release. Chapin relates that "there was one song that Dick Jones [producer of the cast album] didn't want to include on the album but which Steve Sondheim most definitely did. The song was "One More Kiss", and the compromise was that if there was time, it would be recorded, even if Jones couldn't promise it would end up on the album. (It did get recorded but didn't make its way onto the album until the CD reissue years later.)"

=== 1972 Los Angeles ===
The musical was produced at The Muny, St. Louis, Missouri in July 1972 and then transferred to the Shubert Theatre, Century City, California, running from July 22, 1972, through October 1, 1972. It was directed by Prince and starred Dorothy Collins (Sally; replaced by Janet Blair), Alexis Smith (Phyllis), John McMartin (Ben; replaced by Edward Winter), Gene Nelson (Buddy), and Yvonne De Carlo (Carlotta) reprising their original roles. The production was the premiere attraction at the newly constructed 1,800-seat theater, which, coincidentally, was itself razed thirty years later (in 2002, in order to build a new office building), thus mirroring the Follies plot line upon which the musical is based.

=== 1979 Australian Premiere ===
The first fully staged Australian production of Follies opened at the Camberwell Civic Theatre, Melbourne, Australia on 7 September 1979. The production was presented by the Festival Theatre Company as their 25th-anniversary production with Stephen Sondheim's permission. The cast included Marie-Therese Byrne (Sally Durant Plummer), Eric Donnison (Benjamin Stone), Bev McKern (Phyllis Rogers Stone), Barry Quin (Buddy Plummer), Val Lehman (Carlotta Campion), Donald Cant (Young Ben), Jim Murphy (Dimitri Weissman), and Bruce McBrien (Major Domo). Rex Callahan was the director; Jean McQuarrie was the musical director (of a 22-piece orchestra); Ronne Arnold was the choreographer; Terry Ryan was the costume designer; Rex Callahan and Terry Ryan were the scenic designers; and David Murray was the lighting designer.

Follies would enjoy a second fully staged production by CLOC Musical Theatre, which ran from 17 October–1 November 1986, at the Alexander Theatre, Monash University, Clayton, Australia. David Wilson was the director; Kirk Skinner was the musical director (of a 29-piece orchestra); Mary Charleston was the choreographer; Graham McGuffie and Laurie Lane were credited as set designers and scenic artists; and Graham McGuffie was the lighting designer. The cast included Fay Brown (Sally Durant Plummer), Clive Hearne (Benjamin Stone), Bev McKern (repeating her triumphant turn as Phyllis Rogers Stone), Chris Bradtke (Buddy Plummer), Glen Leo (Carlotta Campion), Geoff Upfill (Dimitri Weissman), and Horrie Leek (Major Domo).

=== 1985 Wythenshawe and Lincoln Center ===
A full production ran at the Forum Theatre, Wythenshawe, England, from April 30, 1985, directed by Howard Lloyd-Lewis, design by Chris Kinman, costumes by Charles Cusick-Smith, lighting by Tim Wratten, musical direction by Simon Lowe, and choreographed by Paul Kerryson. The cast included Mary Millar (Sally Durant Plummer), Liz Izen (Young Sally), Meg Johnson (Stella Deems), Les Want (Max Deems), Betty Benfield (Heidi Schiller), Joseph Powell (Roscoe), Chili Bouchier (Hattie Walker), Shirley Greenwood (Emily Whitman), Bryan Burdon (Theodore Whitman), Monica Dell (Solange LaFitte), Jeannie Harris (Carlotta Campion), Josephine Blake (Phyllis Rogers Stone), Kevin Colson (Ben), Debbie Snook (Young Phyllis), Stephen Hale (Young Ben), Bill Bradley (Buddy Plummer), Paul Burton (Young Buddy), David Scase (Dimitri Weismann), Mitch Sebastian (Young Vincent), Kim Ismay (Young Vanessa), Lorraine Croft (Young Stella), and Meryl Richardson (Young Heidi).

A staged concert at Avery Fisher Hall, Lincoln Center, was performed on September 6 and 7, 1985. The concert starred Barbara Cook (Sally), George Hearn (Ben), Mandy Patinkin (Buddy), and Lee Remick (Phyllis), and featured Carol Burnett (Carlotta), Betty Comden (Emily), Adolph Green (Theodore), Liliane Montevecchi (Solange LaFitte), Elaine Stritch (Hattie Walker), Phyllis Newman (Stella Deems), Jim Walton (Young Buddy), Howard McGillin (Young Ben), Liz Callaway (Young Sally), Daisy Prince (Young Phyllis), Andre Gregory (Dmitri), Arthur Rubin (Roscoe), and Licia Albanese (Heidi Schiller). Rich, in his review, noted that "As performed at Avery Fisher Hall, the score emerged as an original whole, in which the 'modern' music and mock vintage tunes constantly comment on each other, much as the script's action unfolds simultaneously in 1971 (the year of the reunion) and 1941 (the year the Follies disbanded)."

Among the reasons the concert was staged was to provide an opportunity to record the entire score. The resulting album was more complete than the original cast album. However, director Herbert Ross took some liberties in adapting the book and score for the concert format—dance music was changed, songs were given false endings, the new dialogue was spoken, reprises were added, and Patinkin was allowed to sing "The God-Why-Don't-You-Love-Me Blues" as a solo instead of a trio with two chorus girls. Portions of the concert were seen by audiences worldwide in the televised documentary about the making of the concert, also released on videotape and DVD, of 'Follies' in Concert.

=== 1987 West End ===
The musical played in the West End at the Shaftesbury Theatre on July 21, 1987, and closed on February 4, 1989, after 644 performances. The producer was Cameron Mackintosh, the direction was by Mike Ockrent, with choreography by Bob Avian and design by Maria Björnson. The cast featured Diana Rigg (Phyllis), Daniel Massey (Ben), Julia McKenzie (Sally), David Healy (Buddy), Lynda Baron, Leonard Sachs, Maria Charles, Pearl Carr & Teddy Johnson. Dolores Gray was praised as Carlotta, continuing to perform after breaking her ankle, although in a reduced version of the part. During the run, Eartha Kitt replaced Gray, sparking somewhat of a comeback (she went on to perform her own one-woman show at The Shaftesbury Theatre to sell-out houses for three weeks from March 18, 1989, after Follies closed). Other cast replacements included Millicent Martin as Phyllis. Julia McKenzie returned to the production for the final four performances.

The book "was extensively reworked by James Goldman, with Sondheim's cooperation and also given an intermission." The producer Cameron Mackintosh did not like "that there was no change in the characters from beginning to end ... In the London production ... the characters come to understand each other." Sondheim "did not think the London script was as good as the original." However, he thought that it was "wonderful" that, at the end of the first act, "the principal characters recognized their younger selves and were able to acknowledge them throughout the last thirty minutes of the piece." Sondheim wrote four new songs: "Country House" (replacing "The Road You Didn't Take"), "Loveland" (replacing the song of the same title), "Ah, But Underneath" (replacing "The Story of Lucy and Jessie", for the non-dancer Diana Rigg), and "Make the Most of Your Music" (replacing "Live, Laugh, Love").

Critics who had seen the production in New York (such as Frank Rich) found it substantially more "upbeat" and lacking in the atmosphere it had originally possessed. According to the Associated Press (AP) reviewer, "A revised version of the Broadway hit Follies received a standing ovation from its opening-night audience and raves from British critics, who stated the show was worth a 16-year wait." The AP quoted Michael Coveney of the Financial Times, who wrote: "Follies is a great deal more than a camp love-in for old burlesque buffs and Sondheim aficionados." In The New York Times, the critic Francis X. Clines wrote: "The initial critics' reviews ranged from unqualified raves to some doubts whether the reworked book of James Goldman is up to the inventiveness of Sondheim's songs. 'A truly fantastic evening,' The Financial Times concluded, while the London Daily News stated 'The musical is inspired,' and The Times described the evening as 'a wonderful idea for a show which has failed to grow into a story.'" The Times critic Irving Wardle stated "It is not much of a story, and whatever possibilities it may have had in theory are scuppered by James Goldman's book ... a blend of lifeless small-talk, bitching and dreadful gags". Clines further commented: "In part, the show is a tribute to musical stage history, in which the 57-year-old Mr Sondheim is steeped, for he first learned song writing at the knee of Oscar Hammerstein II and became the acknowledged master songwriter who bridged past musical stage romance into the modern musical era of irony and neurosis. Follies is a blend of both, and the new production is rounded out with production numbers celebrating love's simple hope for young lovers, its extravagant fantasies for Ziegfeld aficionados, and its fresh lesson for the graying principals."

This production was also recorded on two CDs and was the first full recording.

Follies was voted ninth in a BBC Radio 2 listener poll of the UK's "Nation's Number One Essential Musicals".

=== U.S. regional productions ===
Michigan Opera Theatre (MOT) was the first major American opera company to present Follies as part of their main stage repertoire, running from October 21, 1988, through November 6. The MOT production starred Nancy Dussault (Sally), John-Charles Kelly (Buddy), Juliet Prowse (Phyllis) and Ron Raines (Ben), Edie Adams (Carlotta), Thelma Lee (Hattie), and Dennis Grimaldi (Vincent).

A production also ran from March to April 1995 at the Theatre Under the Stars, Houston, Texas, and in April to May 1995 at the 5th Avenue Theatre, Seattle with Constance Towers (Phyllis), Judy Kaye (Sally), Edie Adams, Denise Darcel, Virginia Mayo, Maxene Andrews (Hattie), and Karen Morrow (Carlotta).

Julianne Boyd directed a fully staged version of Follies in 2005 by the Barrington Stage Company (Massachusetts) in June–July 2005. The principal cast included Kim Crosby (Sally), Leslie Denniston (Phyllis), Jeff McCarthy (Ben), Lara Teeter (Buddy), Joy Franz (Solange), Marni Nixon (Heidi), and Donna McKechnie (Carlotta). Stephen Sondheim attended one of the performances.

=== 1996 and 1998 concerts ===
==== Dublin concert ====
The Dublin Concert was held in May 1996 at the National Concert Hall. Directed by Michael Scott, the cast included Lorna Luft, Millicent Martin, Mary Millar, Dave Willetts, Trevor Jones, Bryan Smyth, Alex Sharpe, Christine Scarry, Aidan Conway and Enda Markey.

==== London concert ====
A concert was held at Theatre Royal, Drury Lane, London, on December 8, 1996, and broadcast on BBC Radio 2 on February 15, 1997. The cast starred Julia McKenzie (Sally), Donna McKechnie (Phyllis), Denis Quilley (Ben) and Ron Moody (Buddy). This show recreated the original Broadway score.

==== Sydney concert ====
Follies was performed in concert at the Sydney Opera House with the Sydney Symphony Orchestra in February 1998 as the highlight of the Sydney Gay and Lesbian Mardi Gras and had three performances. It was directed and staged by Stephen Lloyd Helper and produced by Helper and Alistair Thomson for Mardi Gras. It starred Toni Lamond (Sally), Jill Perryman(Carlotta), Judi Connelli (Phyllis), Terence Donovan (Ben), Nancye Hayes (Hattie), Glenn Butcher (Buddy), Ron Haddrick (Dimitri), Susan Johnston (Heidi), and Leonie Page, Maree Johnson, Mitchell Butel, Maureen Howard. The Sydney Symphony was conducted by maestro Tommy Tycho. It followed a similar presentation at the 1995 Melbourne Festival of Arts with a different cast and orchestra.

=== 1998 Paper Mill Playhouse ===
In 1998 the Paper Mill Playhouse in Millburn, New Jersey staged a landmark production of Follies which Sondheim described in a 1998 interview in the Wall Street Journal as the first production of Follies to present the complete score. It was directed by Robert Johanson with choreography by Jerry Mitchell and conductor Tom Helm serving as music director. It starred Donna McKechnie (Sally), Dee Hoty (Phyllis), Laurence Guittard (Ben), Tony Roberts (Buddy), Kaye Ballard (Hattie), Eddie Bracken (Weismann), and Ann Miller (Carlotta). Phyllis Newman and Liliane Montevecchi reprised the roles they played in the Lincoln Center production.

The Paper Mill production received a full-length recording on two CDs, including not only the entire score as originally written but a lengthy appendix of songs cut from the original production in tryouts. Ben Brantley of The New York Times raved, stating, “In resurrecting the musical memory play that is Follies, Mr. Johanson and his first-rate production team are working from the template established by Mr. Prince, Mr. Bennett and the great designers Boris Aronson (sets) and Florence Klotz (costumes). They don't reinvent Follies, but they do clarify it, without undercutting the show's uniquely impressionistic qualities. The production, bolstered by Mr. Mitchell's elegant choreography, is especially strong in shifting much of the burden of the four principals' romantic history from Mr. Goldman's book to the imagistic use of the characters' younger selves.” Brantley also lauded Roberts and McKechnie, writing, “Mr. Roberts brings a lacerating, truly moving rage to Buddy's exasperation, especially in the song The Right Girl, in which Buddy dances confrontationally with his young alter ego. Ms. McKechnie is beyond fault. The sweet, embattled overeagerness that has characterized her performances since her Tony-winning role in A Chorus Line has never been so appropriately or affectingly used. Nor has her voice, which marvelously plumbs the torchy despair of the ballad Losing My Mind, ever seemed richer or more controlled.”

Ann Miller was singled-out by Brantley for her exceptional performance. There were calls to transfer the production to Broadway. Robert L. Daniels of Variety wrote, “The Paper Mill creative team has mounted a dazzling production. From the gloomy backstage climate of catwalks, call-boards and sandbags to a proscenium arch adorned with sculptural ornamentation, Michael Anania's set addresses the seedy grandeur of a faded theatrical temple doomed to the wrecking ball. Gregg Barnes has costumed the stately showgirls in a gorgeous array of towering headdresses and butterfly wings. The ghostly statuesque beauties who haunt the old showplace float by in shadowy silver and gray gowns.”

However, despite rave reviews, a potential Broadway transfer was nixed by book writer James Goldman's wife Barbara, who controlled her husband's interests in the musical. Barbara Goldman reportedly wanted a different production to be mounted by Roundabout, leading to the eventual 2001 Broadway revival with a different team and cast.

=== 2001 Broadway revival ===
A Broadway revival opened at the Belasco Theatre on April 5, 2001, and closed on July 14, 2001, after 117 performances and 32 previews. This Roundabout Theatre limited engagement had been expected to close on September 30, 2001. Directed by Matthew Warchus with choreography by Kathleen Marshall, it starred Blythe Danner (Phyllis), Judith Ivey (Sally), Treat Williams (Buddy), Gregory Harrison (Ben), Marge Champion, Polly Bergen (Carlotta), Joan Roberts (Laurey from the original Broadway production of Oklahoma!; later replaced by Marni Nixon), Larry Raiken (Roscoe) and an assortment of famous names from the past. Former MGM and onetime Broadway star Betty Garrett, best known to younger audiences for her television work, played Hattie. It was significantly stripped down (earlier productions had featured extravagant sets and costumes) and was not a success critically.

According to an article in The Hollywood Reporter, "almost every performance of the show played to a full house, more often than not to standing-room-only. Tickets always were tough to come by. The reason the final curtain came down Saturday was that being a production by the Roundabout Theatre Company – a subscription-based 'not-for-profit' theater company – it was presented under special Equity terms, with its actors paid a minimal fee. To extend the show, it would have been necessary to negotiate new contracts with the entire company ... because of the Belasco's limited seating, it wasn't deemed financially feasible to do so."

Theater writer and historian John Kenrick wrote "the bad news is that this Follies is a dramatic and conceptual failure. The good news is that it also features some of the most exciting musical moments Broadway has seen in several seasons. Since you don't get those moments from the production, the book or the leads, that leaves the featured ensemble, and in Follies that amounts to a small army ... Marge Champion and Donald Saddler are endearing as the old hoofers ... I dare you not to fall in love with Betty Garrett's understated "Broadway Baby" – you just want to pick her up and hug her. Polly Bergen stops everything cold with "I'm Still Here", bringing a rare degree of introspection to a song that is too often a mere belt-fest ... [T]he emotional highpoint comes when Joan Roberts sings 'One More Kiss'."

=== 2002 London revival ===
A production was mounted at London's Royal Festival Hall in a limited engagement. After previews from August 3, 2002, it opened officially on August 6, and closed on August 31, 2002. Paul Kerryson – who had choreographed the UK premiere in 1984 – directed, and the cast starred David Durham as Ben, Kathryn Evans as Sally, Louise Gold as Phyllis, Julia Goss as Heidi and Henry Goodman as Buddy. Variety singer and performer Joan Savage sang "Broadway Baby". This production conducted by Julian Kelly featured the original Broadway score.

=== 2002 Los Angeles ===
Follies was part of L.A.'s Reprise series, and it was housed at the Wadsworth Theatre, presented as a staged concert, running from June 15 to 23, 2002. The production was directed by Arthur Allan Seidelman, set design by Ray Klausen, lighting design by Tom Ruzika, costumes by Randy Gardell, sound design by Philip G. Allen, choreography by Kay Cole, musical director Gerald Sternbach.

The production starred Bob Gunton (Ben), Warren Berlinger (Dimitri Weismann), Patty Duke (Phyllis), Vikki Carr (Sally), Harry Groener (Buddy), Carole Cook (Hattie), Carol Lawrence (Vanessa), Ken Page (Roscoe), Liz Torres (Stella), Amanda McBroom (Solange), Grover Dale (Vincent), Donna McKechnie (Carlotta), Carole Swarbrick (Christine), Stella Stevens (Dee Dee), Mary Jo Catlett (Emily), Justine Johnston (Heidi), Jean Louisa Kelly (Young Sally), Austin Miller (Young Buddy), Tia Riebling (Young Phyllis), Kevin Earley (Young Ben), Abby Feldman (Young Stella), Barbara Chiofalo (Young Heidi), Trevor Brackney (Young Vincent), Melissa Driscoll (Young Vanessa), Stephen Reed (Kevin), and Billy Barnes (Theodore). Hal Linden originally was going to play Ben, but left because he was cast in the Broadway revival of Cabaret as Herr Schultz. Tom Bosley originally was cast as Dimitri Weismann.

=== 2003 Ann Arbor ===
A concert production at the Michigan Theater in January 2003 reunited the four principal young ghosts of the original Broadway cast: Kurt Peterson, Harvey Evans, Virginia Sandifur, and Marti Rolph. Having originated the young ghosts over 30 years prior, the actors portrayed the older versions of their Broadway roles. Donna McKechnie enjoyed top billing as Carlotta.

=== 2007 New York City Center Encores! ===
New York City Center's Encores! "Great American Musicals in Concert" series featured Follies as its 40th production for six performances in February 2007 in a sold out semi-staged concert. The cast starred Donna Murphy (Phyllis), Victoria Clark (Sally), Victor Garber (Ben) and Michael McGrath (Buddy). Christine Baranski played Carlotta, and Lucine Amara sang Heidi. The cast included Anne Rogers, Jo Anne Worley and Philip Bosco. The director and choreographer was Casey Nicholaw. This production used the original text, and the "Loveland" lyrics performed in the 1987 London production.

=== 2011 Kennedy Center and Broadway ===
The Kennedy Center for the Performing Arts production at the Eisenhower Theater started previews on May 7, 2011, with an official opening on May 21, and closed on June 19, 2011. The cast starred Bernadette Peters as Sally, Jan Maxwell as Phyllis, Elaine Paige as Carlotta, Linda Lavin as Hattie, Ron Raines as Ben and Danny Burstein as Buddy. The production was directed by Eric Schaeffer, with choreography by Warren Carlyle, costumes by Gregg Barnes, set by Derek McLane and lighting by Natasha Katz. Also featured were Rosalind Elias as Heidi, Régine as Solange, Susan Watson as Emily, and Terri White as Stella. The budget was reported to be $7.3 million. The production played to 95% capacity.

Reviews were mixed, with Ben Brantley of The New York Times writing "It wasn't until the second act that I fell in love all over again with Follies". Peter Marks of The Washington Post wrote that the revival "takes an audience halfway to paradise." He praised a "broodingly luminous Jan Maxwell" and Burstein's "hapless onetime stage-door Johnny", as well as "the show's final 20 minutes, when we ascend with the main characters into an ironic vaudeville dreamscape of assorted neuroses – the most intoxicating articulation of the musical's 'Loveland' sequence that I've ever seen." Variety gave a very favorable review to the "lavish and entirely satisfying production", saying that Schaeffer directs "in methodical fashion, building progressively to a crescendo exactly as Sondheim does with so many of his stirring melodies. Several show-stopping routines are provided by choreographer Warren Carlyle." Terry Teachout of The Wall Street Journal noted that "One of the signal achievements of this Follies is that it succeeds in untangling each and every strand of the show's knotty plot ... Mr. Schaeffer is clearly unafraid of the darkness of Follies, so much so that the first act is bitter enough to sting. Yet he and Warren Carlyle ... just as clearly revel in the richness of the knowing pastiche songs with which Mr. Sondheim evokes the popular music of the prerock era."

The production transferred to Broadway at the Marquis Theatre in a limited engagement starting previews on August 7, 2011, with the official opening on September 12, and closing on January 22, 2012, after 151 performances and 38 previews. The four principal performers reprised their roles, as well as Paige as Carlotta. Jayne Houdyshell as Hattie, Mary Beth Peil as Solange LaFitte, and Don Correia as Theodore joined the Broadway cast. A two-disc cast album of this production was recorded by PS Classics and was released on November 29, 2011.

Brantley reviewed the Broadway revival for The New York Times, writing: "Somewhere along the road from Washington to Broadway, the Kennedy Center production of Follies picked up a pulse ... I am happy to report that since then, Ms. Peters has connected with her inner frump, Mr. Raines has found the brittle skeleton within his solid flesh, and Ms. Maxwell and Mr. Burstein have only improved. Two new additions to the cast, Jayne Houdyshell and Mary Beth Peil, are terrific. This production has taken on the glint of crystalline sharpness." The production's run was extended, and its grosses exceeded expectations, but it did not recoup its investment.

The Broadway production won the Drama League Award, Distinguished Production of a Musical Revival for 2011–2012 and the Drama Desk Award for Outstanding Revival of a Musical, Outstanding Actor in a Musical (Burstein) and Outstanding Costume Design (Barnes). Out of seven Tony Award nominations, including Best Revival of a Musical, it won only one, with Barnes awarded Best Costume Design in a Musical at the 66th Tony Awards.

=== 2012 Los Angeles ===
The 2011 Broadway and Kennedy Center production transferred to the Ahmanson Theatre, Los Angeles, California, in a limited engagement, from May 3, 2012, through June 9. The majority of the Broadway cast reprised their roles, with the exception of Bernadette Peters, who had prior concert commitments and was replaced by Victoria Clark in the role of Sally, a role she had played previously in New York. Other new cast members included Carol Neblett as Heidi, Sammy Williams as Theodore and Obba Babatunde as Max.

=== 2013 Toulon Opera House (France) ===
For its first production in France, Follies was presented at the Toulon Opera House in March 2013. This English-language production, using the full original orchestration, was directed by Olivier Bénézech and conducted by David Charles Abell. The cast featured Charlotte Page (Sally), Liz Robertson (Phyllis), Graham Bickley (Ben), Jérôme Pradon (Buddy), Nicole Croisille (Carlotta), Julia Sutton (Hattie) and Fra Fee (Young Buddy).

=== 2016 Australian concert version ===
A concert version at the Melbourne Recital Centre, staged with a full 23-piece orchestra and Australian actors Philip Quast (Ben), David Hobson (Buddy), Lisa McCune (Sally), Anne Wood (Phyllis), Rowan Witt (Young Buddy), Sophie Wright (Young Sally), Nancy Hayes (Hattie), Debra Byrne (Carlotta), and Queenie van de Zandt (Stella). The production was directed by Tyran Parke and produced by StoreyBoard Entertainment.

=== 2017 London revival ===
A London revival was performed in the Olivier Theatre at the National Theatre (August 22 until November 4, 2017 – later extended to January 3, 2018, as extensions are common practice at the National Theatre). The production was directed by Dominic Cooke, choreographed by Bill Deamer and starred Peter Forbes as Buddy, Imelda Staunton as Sally, Janie Dee as Phyllis, Philip Quast as Ben and Tracie Bennett as Carlotta. This production notably goes back to the original plan of a one-act performance. The production was broadcast live to cinemas worldwide on November 16 through the National Theatre Live program.

The production returned to the Olivier Theatre on February 14, 2019, playing until May 11. Janie Dee and Peter Forbes returned as Phyllis and Buddy, while Joanna Riding and Alexander Hanson replaced Staunton and Quast as Sally and Ben. Bennett also reprised her Olivier-nominated performance. A recording of the National Theatre production was released on January 18, 2019.

The 2017 production was nominated for 10 Laurence Olivier Awards and won 2 for Best Musical Revival and Best Costume Design (by Vicki Mortimer) at the 2018 Laurence Olivier Awards.

=== 2024 Carnegie Hall concert ===
On 20 June 2024, a concert version of Follies at Carnegie Hall was staged and directed by Jack Cummings III and music directed by Joey Chancey. The evening was hosted by Ted Chapin and original cast member Kurt Peterson. The cast included Kate Baldwin, Julie Benko, Mikaela Bennett, Michael Berresse, Alexandra Billings, Klea Blackhurst, Lauren Blackman, Harolyn Blackwell, Stephen Bogardus, Julianna Brown, Hal Linden, Carolee Carmello, Jim Caruso, Jessica Chambers, Nikki Renée Daniels, Mamie Duncan-Gibbs, Christine Ebersole, Hannah Elless, Katie Finneran, Santino Fontana, Alexander Gemignani, Christian Mark Gibbs, Miguel Gil, Ruth Gottschall, Olivia Elease Hardy, Grey Henson, Fernell Hogan, Jennifer Holliday, JoAnn M. Hunter, Candice Katakeyama, Isabel Keating, Marc Kudisch, Beth Leavel, Adriane Lenox, Norm Lewis, Alicia Lundgren, Abby Matsusaka, Ryan McCartan, Dana Moore, Erin N. Moore, Michele Pawk, Margo Sappington, Thom Sesma, Barbara Walsh, Nina White, Jacob Keith Watson, and Karen Ziemba.

== Casts and characters ==
The characters and original cast:

Character	Broadway	Lincoln Center	West End	Paper Mill Playhouse	1st Broadway revival	1st West End revival	City Center Encores!	2nd Broadway revival	Royal Albert Hall	Australian Concert	London	London revival
Character	1971	1985	1987	1998	2001	2002	2007	2011	2015	2016	2017	2019
Sally Durant Plummer	Dorothy Collins	Barbara Cook	Julia McKenzie	Donna McKechnie	Judith Ivey	Kathryn Evans	Victoria Clark	Bernadette Peters	Ruthie Henshall	Lisa McCune	Imelda Staunton	Joanna Riding
Benjamin Stone	John McMartin	George Hearn	Daniel Massey	Laurence Guittard	Gregory Harrison	David Durham	Victor Garber	Ron Raines	Alexander Hanson	Philip Quast	Philip Quast	Alexander Hanson
Phyllis Rogers Stone	Alexis Smith	Lee Remick	Diana Rigg	Dee Hoty	Blythe Danner	Louise Gold	Donna Murphy	Jan Maxwell	Christine Baranski	Anne Wood	Janie Dee	Janie Dee
Buddy Plummer	Gene Nelson	Mandy Patinkin	David Healy	Tony Roberts	Treat Williams	Henry Goodman	Michael McGrath	Danny Burstein	Peter Polycarpou	David Hobson	Peter Forbes	Peter Forbes
Young Sally	Marti Rolph	Liz Callaway	Deborah Poplett	Danette Holden	Lauren Ward	Emma Clifford	Katie Klaus	Lora Lee Gayer	Amy Ellen Richardson	Sophie Wright	Alex Young	Gemma Sutton
Young Ben	Kurt Peterson	Howard McGillin	Simon Green	Michael Gruber	Richard Roland	Hugh Maynard	Colin Donnell	Nick Verina	Alistair Brammer	Lachlan Graham	Adam Rhys-Charles	Ian McIntosh
Young Phyllis	Virginia Sandifur	Daisy Prince	Gillian Bevan	Meredith Patterson	Erin Dilly	Kerry Jay	Jenny Powers	Kirsten Scott	Laura Pitt-Pulford	Jenni Little	Zizi Strallen	Christine Tucker
Young Buddy	Harvey Evans	Jim Walton	Evan Pappas	Billy Hartung	Joey Sorge	Matthew Cammelle	Curtis Holbrook	Christian Delcroix	Jos Slovick	Rowan Witt	Fred Haig	Henry Hepple
Carlotta Campion	Yvonne De Carlo	Carol Burnett	Dolores Gray	Ann Miller	Polly Bergen	Diane Langton	Christine Baranski	Elaine Paige	Betty Buckley	Debra Byrne	Tracie Bennett	Tracie Bennett
Stella Deems	Mary McCarty	Phyllis Newman	Lynda Baron	Phyllis Newman	Carol Woods	Shezwae Powell	Joanne Worley	Terri White	Anita Dobson	Queenie van de Zandt	Dawn Hope	Dawn Hope
Heidi Schiller	Justine Johnston	Licia Albanese	Adele Leigh	Carol Skarimbas	Joan Roberts	Julia Goss	Lucine Amara	Rosalind Elias	Charlotte Page	Cheryl Barker	Josephine Barstow	Felicity Lott/Josephine Barstow
Hattie Walker	Ethel Shutta	Elaine Stritch	Margaret Courtenay	Kaye Ballard	Betty Garrett	Joan Savage	Mimi Hines	Jayne Houdyshell	Lorna Luft	Nancye Hayes	Di Botcher	Claire Moore
Dimitri Weismann	Arnold Moss	Andre Gregory	Leonard Sachs	Eddie Bracken	Louis Zorich	Russell Dixon	Philip Bosco	David Sabin	Alistair McGowan	Robert Grubb	Gary Raymond	Gary Raymond

=== Notable replacements ===
==== Broadway (1971–1972) ====
- Sally Durant Plummer: Jan Clayton (s/b), Ethel Barrymore Colt (u/s)
- Benjamin Stone: Peter Walker (u/s)
- Phyllis Rogers Stone: Marion Marlowe (s/b)
- Buddy Plummer: Dick Latessa (u/s)
- Young Phyllis Rogers: Suzanne Rogers (u/s)
- Carlotta Campion: Marion Marlowe (s/b)
- Stella Deems: Helon Blount (u/s)
- Heidi Schiller: Ethel Barrymore Colt (u/s)
- Hattie Walker: Helon Blount (u/s)

==== Broadway (2001) ====
- Buddy Plummer: Don Correia (s/b)
- Young Sally Durant: Kelli O'Hara (u/s)
- Young Phyllis Rogers: Kelli O'Hara
- Carlotta Campion: Joan Marshall (u/s)
- Stella Deems: Joan Marshall (u/s)
- Heidi Schiller: Marni Nixon, Joan Marshall (u/s)
- Hattie Walker: Joan Marshall (u/s)

==== Broadway (2011) ====
- Buddy Plummer: Don Correia (u/s)

== Critical response ==
In the foreword to "Everything Was Possible", Frank Rich wrote: "From the start, critics have been divided about Follies, passionately pro or con but rarely on the fence ... Is it really a great musical, or merely the greatest of all cult musicals?" (Chapin, p. xi) Ted Chapin wrote, "Taken as a whole, the collection of reviews Follies received was as rangy as possible." (Chapin, p. 300) In his The New York Times review of the original Broadway production, Clive Barnes wrote: "it is stylish, innovative, it has some of the best lyrics I have ever encountered, and above all it is a serious attempt to deal with the musical form." Barnes also called the story shallow and Sondheim's words a joy "even when his music sends shivers of indifference up your spine."

Walter Kerr wrote in The New York Times about the original production: "Follies is intermissionless and exhausting, an extravaganza that becomes so tedious ... because its extravaganzas have nothing to do with its pebble of a plot." On the other hand, Martin Gottfried wrote: "Follies is truly awesome and, if it is not consistently good, it is always great."

Time magazine wrote about the original Broadway production: "At its worst moments, Follies is mannered and pretentious, overreaching for Significance. At its best moments—and there are many—it is the most imaginative and original new musical that Broadway has seen in years."

Frank Rich, in reviewing the 1985 concert in The New York Times, wrote: "Friday's performance made the case that this Broadway musical ... can take its place among our musical theater's very finest achievements." Ben Brantley, reviewing the 1998 Paper Mill Playhouse production in The New York Times, concluded that it was a "fine, heartfelt production, which confirms Follies as a landmark musical and a work of art ...".

The Time reviewer wrote of the 2001 Broadway revival: "Even in its more modest incarnation, Follies has, no question, the best score on Broadway." He noted, though, that "I'm sorry the cast was reduced from 52 to 38, the orchestra from 26 players to 14 ... To appreciate the revival, you must buy into James Goldman's book, which is peddling a panoramically bleak take on marriage." Finally, he wrote: "But Follies never makes fun of the honorable musical tradition to which it belongs. The show and the score have a double vision: simultaneously squinting at the messes people make of their lives and wide-eyed at the lingering grace and lift of the music they want to hear. Sondheim's songs aren't parodies or deconstructions; they are evocations that recognize the power of a love song. In 1971 or 2001, Follies validates the legend that a Broadway show can be an event worth dressing up for."

Brantley, reviewing the 2007 Encores! concert for The New York Times, wrote: "I have never felt the splendid sadness of Follies as acutely as I did watching the emotionally transparent concert production ... At almost any moment, to look at the faces of any of the principal performers ... is to be aware of people both bewitched and wounded by the contemplation of who they used to be. When they sing, in voices layered with ambivalence and anger and longing, it is clear that it is their past selves whom they are serenading."

== Recordings ==
There have been six recordings of Follies released: the original 1971 Broadway cast album; Follies in Concert, Avery Fisher Hall (1985); the original London production (1987); the Paper Mill Playhouse (1998); the 2011 Broadway revival; and the 2017 London revival. The original cast album has always been controversial, because significant portions of the score were cut to fit onto one LP. However, as Kritzerland Records head Bruce Kimmel wrote in his liner notes to Kritzerland's remixed version of the album, "What it did have made it something that, despite the frustrations, meant it would never be bettered – the original cast." The cast recording of the 2011 Broadway revival, by PS Classics, was released officially on November 29, 2011, and was in pre-sale before the store release. PS Classics co-founder Tommy Krasker stated "We've never had the kind of reaction that we've had for Follies. Not only has it already outsold every other album at our website, but the steady stream of emails from customers has been amazing." This recording includes "extended segments of the show's dialogue". The theatermania.com reviewer wrote that "The result is an album that, more so than any of the other existing recordings, allows listeners to re-experience the heartbreaking collision of past and present that's at the core of the piece." The recording of the 2011 revival was nominated for a Grammy Award for Best Musical Theater Album at the 55th Annual Grammy Awards. The 2017 London revival cast was recorded after the production closed in January 2018, and was released in early 2019.

== Film adaptation ==
In January 2015, it was reported that Rob Marshall signed on to direct, with Meryl Streep rumored to star. Tony Award-winning playwright and Academy Award-nominated screenwriter John Logan has expressed interest in writing the adaptation.

In November 2019, it was announced that Dominic Cooke will adapt the screenplay as well as direct, following the successful 2017 National Theatre revival in London, which returned in 2019 due to popular demand.

== Awards and nominations ==
=== Original Broadway production ===
Year	Award	Category	Nominee	Result
1971	Drama Desk Awards	Outstanding Choreography	Michael Bennett	Won
1971	Drama Desk Awards	Outstanding Lyrics	Stephen Sondheim	Won
1971	Drama Desk Awards	Outstanding Music	Stephen Sondheim	Won
1971	Drama Desk Awards	Outstanding Costume Design	Florence Klotz	Won
1971	Drama Desk Awards	Outstanding Set Design	Boris Aronson	Won
1971	Drama Desk Awards	Outstanding Performance	Alexis Smith	Won
1971	Drama Desk Awards	Outstanding Director	Harold Prince and Michael Bennett	Won
1971	New York Drama Critics' Circle Awards	Best Musical	Stephen Sondheim and James Goldman	Won
1972	Tony Awards	Best Musical		Nominated
1972	Tony Awards	Best Original Score	Stephen Sondheim	Won
1972	Tony Awards	Best Book of a Musical	James Goldman	Nominated
1972	Tony Awards	Best Performance by a Leading Actress in a Musical	Alexis Smith	Won
1972	Tony Awards	Best Performance by a Leading Actress in a Musical	Dorothy Collins	Nominated
1972	Tony Awards	Best Performance by a Featured Actor in a Musical	Gene Nelson	Nominated
1972	Tony Awards	Best Direction of a Musical	Harold Prince and Michael Bennett	Won
1972	Tony Awards	Best Choreography	Michael Bennett	Won
1972	Tony Awards	Best Scenic Design	Boris Aronson	Won
1972	Tony Awards	Best Costume Design	Florence Klotz	Won
1972	Tony Awards	Best Lighting Design	Tharon Musser	Won

=== Original London production ===
Year	Award	Category	Nominee	Result
1987	Laurence Olivier Awards	Musical of the Year		Won
1987	Laurence Olivier Awards	Actress of the Year in a Musical	Julia McKenzie	Nominated

=== 2001 Broadway revival ===
Year	Award	Category	Nominee	Result
2001	Tony Awards	Best Revival of a Musical		Nominated
2001	Tony Awards	Best Performance by a Leading Actress in a Musical	Blythe Danner	Nominated
2001	Tony Awards	Best Performance by a Featured Actress in a Musical	Polly Bergen	Nominated
2001	Tony Awards	Best Costume Design	Theoni V. Aldredge	Nominated
2001	Tony Awards	Best Orchestrations	Jonathan Tunick	Nominated
2001	Drama Desk Awards	Outstanding Revival of a Musical		Nominated
2001	Drama Desk Awards	Outstanding Featured Actress in a Musical	Polly Bergen	Nominated
2001	Drama Desk Awards	Outstanding Orchestrations	Jonathan Tunick	Nominated

=== 2011 Broadway revival ===
Year	Award	Category	Nominee	Result
2012	Tony Awards	Best Revival of a Musical		Nominated
2012	Tony Awards	Best Performance by a Leading Actor in a Musical	Danny Burstein	Nominated
2012	Tony Awards	Best Performance by a Leading Actor in a Musical	Ron Raines	Nominated
2012	Tony Awards	Best Performance by a Leading Actress in a Musical	Jan Maxwell	Nominated
2012	Tony Awards	Best Performance by a Featured Actress in a Musical	Jayne Houdyshell	Nominated
2012	Tony Awards	Best Costume Design	Gregg Barnes	Won
2012	Tony Awards	Best Lighting Design	Natasha Katz	Nominated
2012	Tony Awards	Best Sound Design	Kai Harada	Nominated
2012	Drama Desk Awards	Outstanding Revival of a Musical		Won
2012	Drama Desk Awards	Outstanding Actor in a Musical	Danny Burstein	Won
2012	Drama Desk Awards	Outstanding Actress in a Musical	Jan Maxwell	Nominated
2012	Drama Desk Awards	Outstanding Actress in a Musical	Bernadette Peters	Nominated
2012	Drama Desk Awards	Outstanding Featured Actress in a Musical	Elaine Paige	Nominated
2012	Drama Desk Awards	Outstanding Director of a Musical	Eric Schaeffer	Nominated
2012	Drama Desk Awards	Outstanding Choreography	Warren Carlyle	Nominated
2012	Drama Desk Awards	Outstanding Set Design	Derek McLane	Nominated
2012	Drama Desk Awards	Outstanding Costume Design	Gregg Barnes	Won
2012	Drama Desk Awards	Outstanding Sound Design	Kai Harada	Nominated
2012	Grammy Award	Best Musical Theater Album		Nominated

=== 2017 London revival ===
Year	Award	Category	Nominee	Result
2017	Critics' Circle Theatre Award	Best Director	Dominic Cooke	Won
2017	Critics' Circle Theatre Award	Best Designer	Vicki Mortimer	Won
2017	Evening Standard Theatre Awards	Best Musical		Nominated
2017	Evening Standard Theatre Awards	Best Musical Performance	Janie Dee	Nominated
2017	Evening Standard Theatre Awards	Best Director	Dominic Cooke	Nominated
2018	Laurence Olivier Awards	Best Musical Revival		Won
2018	Laurence Olivier Awards	Best Actress in a Musical	Janie Dee	Nominated
2018	Laurence Olivier Awards	Best Actress in a Musical	Imelda Staunton	Nominated
2018	Laurence Olivier Awards	Best Actress in a Supporting Role in a Musical	Tracie Bennett	Nominated
2018	Laurence Olivier Awards	Best Director	Dominic Cooke	Nominated
2018	Laurence Olivier Awards	Best Theatre Choreographer	Bill Deamer	Nominated
2018	Laurence Olivier Awards	Best Set Design	Vicki Mortimer	Nominated
2018	Laurence Olivier Awards	Best Costume Design	Vicki Mortimer	Won
2018	Laurence Olivier Awards	Best Lighting Design	Paule Constable	Nominated
2018	Laurence Olivier Awards	Outstanding Achievement in Music	The orchestra, Nicholas Skilbeck and Nigel Lilley	Nominated
