= Harlot (poetry collection) =

Poetry collection by Jill Alexander Essbaum

Harlot is a 2007 poetry collection by Jill Alexander Essbaum. It was published by No Tell Books. It has 39 poems which focus on issues of God, sex, and death. This combination of Christianity and sexuality is a hallmark of Essbaum's work, and all reviews commented on it. It was Essbaum's fifth collection of poetry overall. H.L. Hix wrote “one hears [in Harlot] Herbert and Wyatt and Donne, their parallax view of religion as sex and sex as religion … their fondling and squeezing of language.”

Some of the more commented-upon poems in the collection are the title poem, "Heart", "Folie à Deux", "Ménage à Trois", "Bad Friday", and "Tryptych", which originally appeared in Coconut Eight.

== Critical reviews ==
The collection was favorably reviewed in The Best American Poetry, where guest editor Bruce Covey complimented the "brilliantly sexy poems" and singled out Essbaum as "contemporary poetry’s best punster, a skill evidenced within 'Triptych'."

Mike Snider saw Essbaum perform several of the poems at the Westchester Poetry Conference, and called it a "powerful work, sometimes heartbreaking, and a lot of fun along the way."
