= Deux Montagnes =

Deux Montagnes is French for "Two Mountains", and can represent:

- Lac des Deux Montagnes, a lake in the Greater Montreal Area
- Deux-Montagnes, Quebec, a municipality in Canada, named after the lake
- Deux-Montagnes Regional County Municipality, Quebec, a regional government (county) in Canada, with county seat at Deux-Montagnes
- Deux-Montagnes line, a former commuter train line in Greater Montreal that ends at Deux-Montagnes
- Deux-Montagnes station, a train station, terminus of the Réseau express métropolitain
- Deux-Montagnes (provincial electoral district), a Quebec provincial riding that encompasses the municipality of the same name
- Deux-Montagnes (electoral district), a former Canadian federal riding that encompassed the municipality of the same name
- Argenteuil—Deux-Montagnes, a former Canadian federal riding
- Blainville—Deux-Montagnes, a former Canadian federal riding

== See also ==
- Two Mountains (disambiguation)
