= Follies (original Broadway cast recording) =

Cast recording by the original Broadway cast
- Released: 1971
- Label: Capitol

Follies, subtitled A New Musical and Original Broadway Cast, is an album containing a recording of Stephen Sondheim's 1971 Broadway musical Follies made by its original cast. The album was released by Capitol Records in the same year.

== Background ==
The album was produced by Dick Jones.

== Critical reception ==
Professional ratings
Review scores
| Source | Rating |
|---|---|
| AllMusic | 3/5 stars |

In a contemporary review for AllMusic, William Ruhlmann called the score "one of Sondheim's greatest", listing the songs "Broadway Baby", "Could I Leave You?", and "I'm Still Here" as some of its highlights.

== Chart performance ==
The album spent three weeks on the Billboard Top LPs chart, peaking at number 172.

== Track listing ==
LP – Capitol Records SO-761

All lyrics are written by Stephen Sondheim; all music is composed by Stephen Sondheim.

Side 1
| No. | Title | Artist(s) | Length |
|---|---|---|---|
| 1. | "Prologue" – "Beautiful Girls" | Arnold Moss, Michael Bartlett & Company | 4:25 |
| 2. | "Don't Look at Me" | Dorothy Collins, John McMartin | 1:47 |
| 3. | "Waiting for the Girls Upstairs" | Gene Nelson, John McMartin, Alexis Smith, Dorothy Collins, Harvey Evans, Kurt Peterson, Virginia Sandifur, Marti Rolph | 5:29 |
| 4. | "Ah, Paris!" – "Broadway Baby" | Fifi d'Orsay, Ethel Shutta | 3:15 |
| 5. | "The Road You Didn't Take" | John McMartin | 2:40 |
| 6. | "In Buddy's Eyes" | Dorothy Collins | 2:32 |
| 7. | "Who's That Woman?" | Mary McCarty & Company | 3:32 |
| 8. | "I'm Still Here" | Yvonne De Carlo | 1:19 |

Side 2
| No. | Title | Artist(s) | Length |
|---|---|---|---|
| 1. | "Too Many Mornings" | John McMartin, Dorothy Collins | 4:22 |
| 2. | "The Right Girl" | Gene Nelson | 4:27 |
| 3. | "Could I Leave You?" | Alexis Smith | 3:02 |
| 4. | "You're Gonna Love Tomorrow" – "Love Will See Us Through" | Kurt Peterson, Virginia Sandifur, Harvey Evans, Marti Rolph | 3:39 |
| 5. | "The God-Why-Don't-You-Love-Me Blues" | Gene Nelson, Suzanne Rogers, Rita O'Connor | 3:03 |
| 6. | "Losing My Mind" | Dorothy Collins | 3:40 |
| 7. | "The Story of Lucy and Jessie" | Alexis Smith | 1:50 |
| 8. | "Live, Laugh, Love" – "Finale" | John McMartin & Company | 3:20 |

Some numbers have been abridged for recording

== Personnel ==
- Orchestra and chorus conducted by Harold Hastings
- Produced for records by Dick Jones

== Charts ==
| Chart (1971) | Peak position |
|---|---|
| US Billboard Top LPs | 172 |

== Awards ==
| Year | Award type | Categories | Results | Ref. |
|---|---|---|---|---|
| 1972 | Grammy Awards | Best Score from an Original Cast Show Album | Nominated | |
