= Folly, Virginia =

Unincorporated community in Virginia, US

Coordinates: 37°52′46″N 76°19′40″W

Folly is an unincorporated community in Northumberland County, in the U.S. state of Virginia.

According to tradition, a lumberman made a "folly" when he overestimated the amount of timber in the area, hence the name.
