= Folie à Deux (winery) =

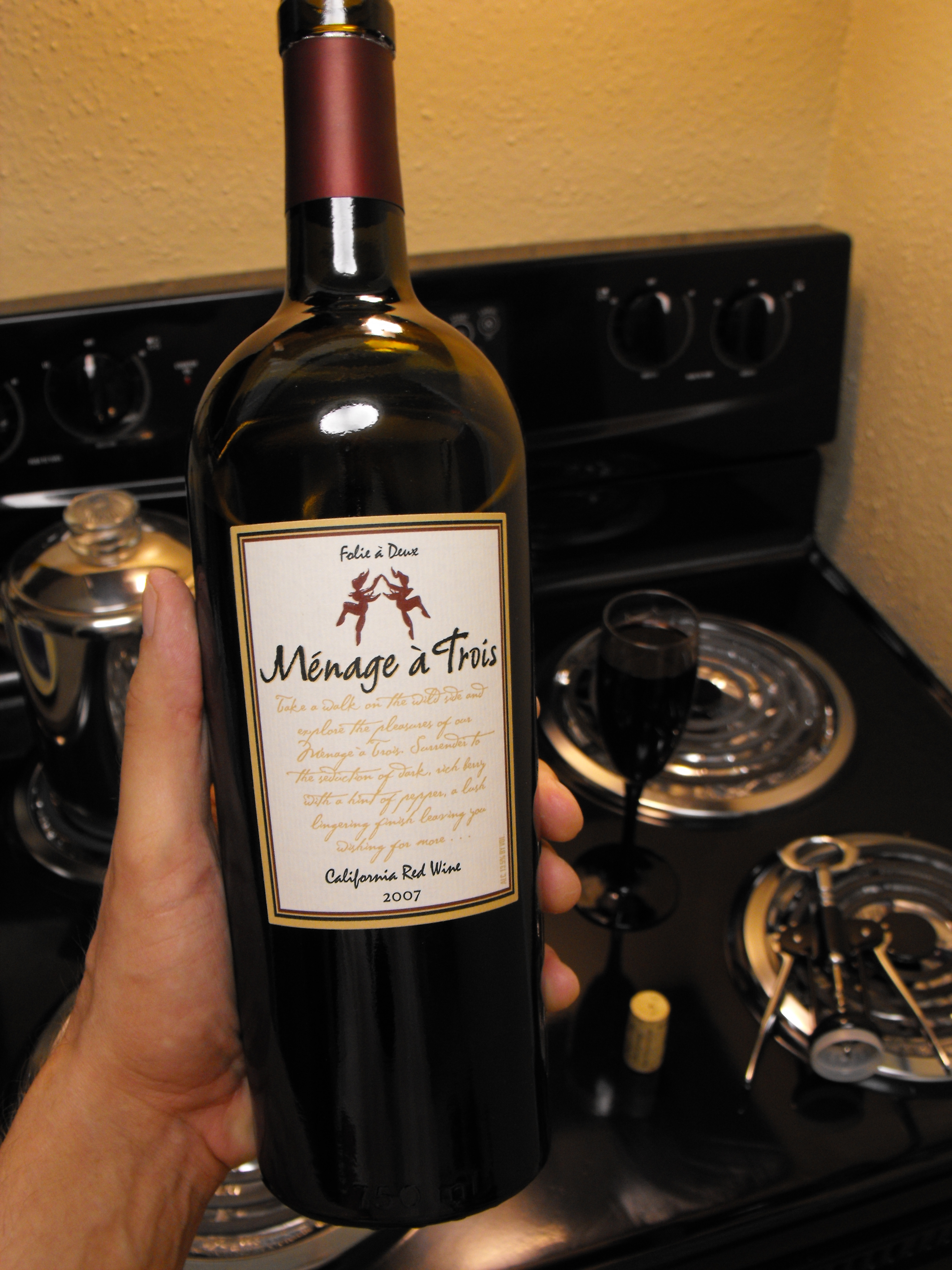
Ménage à Trois from Folie à Deux

Folie à Deux is a Napa Valley winery in Sonoma County, California, which is part of the Trinchero Family Estates.

== History ==
Folie à Deux was founded in 1981 by two psychiatrists, who took the name from a psychiatric term for a fantasy or delusion shared by two people. In 1995, the winery was out of bankruptcy to a private group of investors. In 2004, they sold the winery to the Trinchero Family Estates, a Napa Valley wine company owned and operated by the Trinchero family.

== Varietals ==
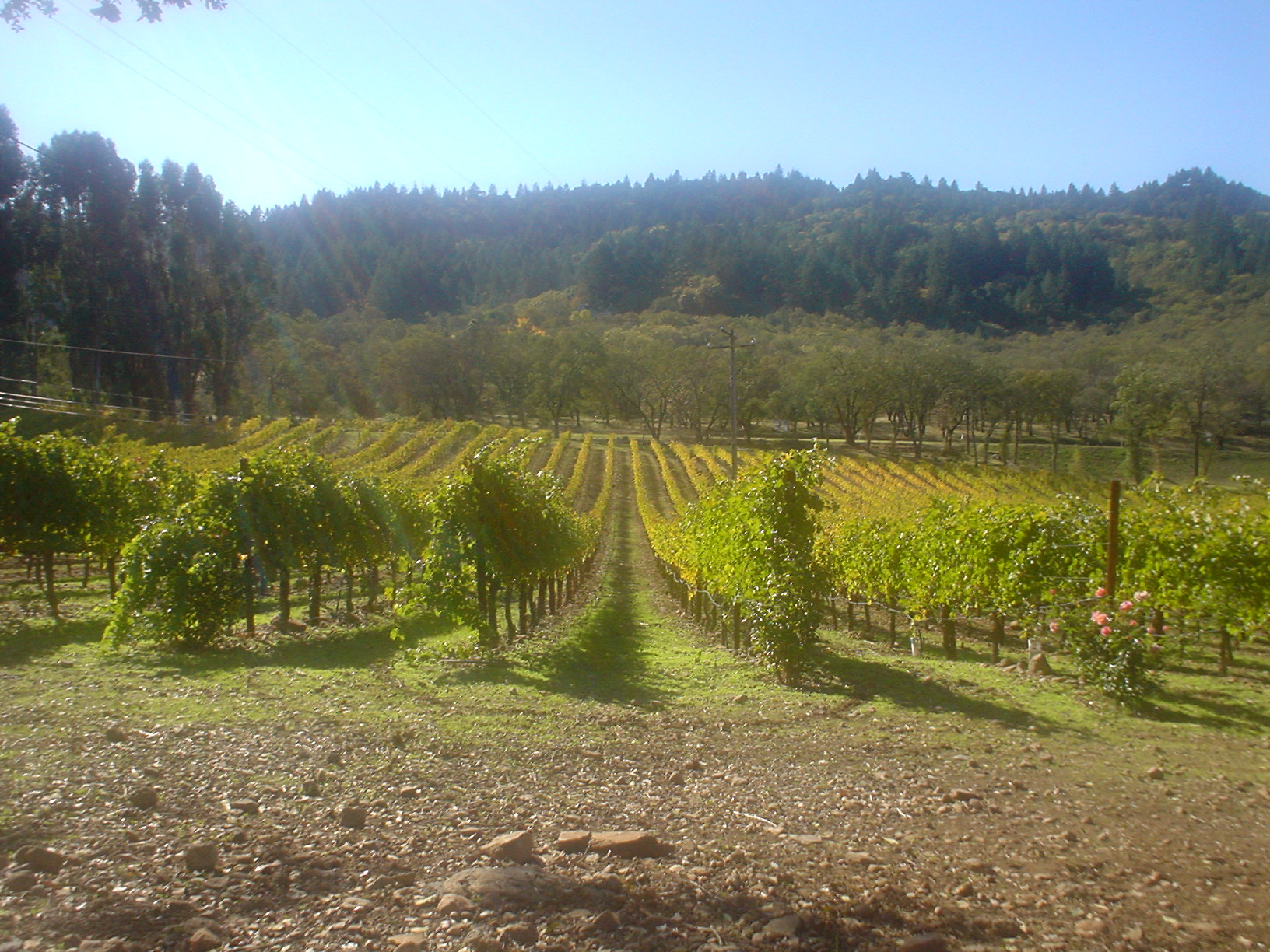
Napa vineyards of Folie à Deux

Folie à Deux currently makes Cabernet Sauvignon, Pinot Noir, Zinfandel, Merlot, Chardonnay, and Sauvignon blanc. The winery also produces three wine blends and four varietals under the name Menage à Trois. Menage à Trois Red was the top selling red wine product in the United States as of 2010. The Menage à Trois brand sold 1.6 million cases in 2009, and Menage à Trois was named the "Wine Brand of the Year" by the beverage industry publication Market Watch.
