= The Unsafe Asylum =

2018 book by Anirudh Kala

- Author: Anirudh Kala
- Language: English
- Genre: Fiction
- Publisher: Speaking Tiger Books
- Publication date: 2018
- Publication place: India
- Pages: 256
- ISBN: 978-93-87693-27-2

The Unsafe Asylum: Stories of Partition and Madness is a 2018 collection of short stories by Anirudh Kala. The book includes a number of interlinking stories which explore the effects of partition on the mental health of people from both India and Pakistan.

== Background ==
The author, Anirudh Kala, is an Indian psychiatrist based in Ludhiana, Punjab, India. He is the founding president of the Indian Association of Private Psychiatry and also the Indo-Pak Punjab Psychiatric Society. The latter is a cross-border initiative forging links between mental health professionals of the Indian and Pakistani Punjab provinces. The stories in this book were inspired by Kala's personal experiences from his visits to mental health institutions in Pakistan, and also his experience with patients who visited his clinic in India.

== Plot summaries ==
The book is a compilation of thirteen short stories, set against the backdrop of the Partition of India in 1947. The stories portray the psychological effect of communal riots during partition. The stories have been written mainly as first person narratives, and some as third person narratives.

=== "No Forgiveness Necessary" ===
Rulda and Fattu are inmates at the Mental Hospital, Lahore, Pakistan. Their mental health conditions are treated successfully, they cannot be discharged as neither of their relatives arrives to pick them up. Iqbal Junaid Hussain, a doctor at the hospital's asylum has been tasked to prepare a list of all the Hindu and Sikh patients, for deporting them to India after the partition. He is shot down on his way out of the hospital during the riots.

After three decades, Iqbal's son Asif visits Phagwara, to find out the reason for his father's murder. He learns that Ramneek Singh, the person who killed his father, was a soldier who wanted to avenge his son's murder by killing a Muslim, who happened to be Iqbal.

=== "Belly Button" ===
Prakash Singh Kohli visits Pakistan as a part of a caravan of Sikh pilgrims going to Nankana Sahib. Although he has a visa to visit only Lahore, he goes on to visit Gujranwala where he was born in August 1947. He meets Roshaan Bibi, a midwife who helped his mother during Prakash's birth, but could not do it properly due to the terror outside. As a result, Prakash ended up with an abnormal navel for life.

=== "Partitioning Madness" ===
This story is about the exchange of mental patients between India and Pakistan, three years after the partition. Rulda Singh tells his story to the medical superintendent Mohinder Singh and Prakash.

The story ends with Prakash questioning the medical superintendent on how it was possible that more than half the patients who were to be sent to India died in the years after the partition and before the exchange. The hospital report said they died due to cholera.

=== "Sita's Bus" ===
Harpreet Cheema from Jullundur was married to Manjeet Cheema who owned transport buses in Sialkot. She starts working as a physical training instructor after her marriage, despite her mother-in-law's reluctance. The family plans to move to Gurdaspur where Manjeet's sister in married. Post partition, Gurdaspur was likely to be in India, while Sialkot was sure to be in Pakistan. Their house is set on fire during riots and she passes out. Harpreet wakes up and see that she is in a Muslim household and Murtaza has brought her to his home. By the end of the month, Harpreet agrees to convert to Islam and is renamed Firdaus. She marries Murtaza's brother Aslam and returns to her previous job.

On hearing about a bangle-seller who may be looking for Harpreet Cheema, Aslam goes to meet his police inspector friend Farukh who tells them that both the governments have signed an agreement cancelling religious conversions and subsequent marriages. Local police forces have been involved and incentivised to recover such women. Farukh suggests for them to escape to Bhimber, which is in Azad Kashmir. When they both return to Sialkot, a government officer is waiting for them and Harpreet is taken to Jullunder where her first husband Manjeet will receive her in a few days. She is pregnant at that time and her fetus is aborted without her consent. She then boards the bus to Delhi and on being asked her name replies, 'Harpreet' and then says Agge pichhe kuchh nahi (Nothing before or after).

=== "The Diary of a Mental Hospital Intern" ===
An intern goes to visit the Mental Hospital in Ranchi for two months. There are two separate hospitals, one for Indians and another for Europeans. When the Sikh and Hindu patients from Lahore were brought to India, Punjabis were kept at the hospital in Amritsar and the rest were brought to Ranchi.

=== "Folie à Deux" ===
A story of shared psychosis, "Folie à Deux", is about a couple who move from Multan to Patiala in 1948. A year later the woman goes through a nervous breakdown and develops a psychotic belief that bearded Muslims threaten to cut off her breasts. The woman runs out and is found at the railway station a few hours later. She is taken to a local Muslim healer and fully recovers over the next few months. Over the next 20 years she goes on to give birth to three children and also endures the loss of her husband. But one day, she breaks down again and jumps over the roof to her death.

A year later, her son starts having visions that people are trying to kill him and an ISI agent is after him. Another year later, his younger sister becomes delusional that their mother has been killed by a Muslim doctor. The story ends when the eldest sister enters Kala's clinic screaming and accusing him of being a psycho killer.

=== "The Mad Prophesier" ===
Doctor Prakash Kohli visits Lahore to meet his friend, doctor Asif Junaid Hussain. He meets some of his patients, including Haq, who physically resembles Amitabh Bachchan and falls ill every time Amitabh Bachchan is sick.

One day, Prakash and Asif visit the Lahore Mental Hospital. Prakash meets Fattu who has been living there for forty years and has become known as a prophesier among politicians who believe he can successfully predict events such as the breaking away of East Pakistan (now Bangladesh). He has been trying to build a tunnel to connect the hospital with Amritsar Mental Hospital, so that he can meet Rulda who was relocated after the partition.

=== "Love During Armistice" ===
Prakash and his wife Jasmeet visit Kufri to meet a boy named Brij who is in love with Benazir Bhutto, whom he had seen once, when she was visiting Shimla for the Simla Agreement in 1972 with her father Zulfikar Ali Bhutto. He writes letters to her, which are intercepted by a teacher, and regularly dreams about her.

A year later, after Prakash has joined the Post Graduate Medical Institute, Chandigarh, Brij is admitted to the hospital for his illness. He has stopped writing to Benazir now as she is visiting frequently in dreams and they no longer need letters to communicate. After three consecutive nights at the hospital and not dreaming of Benazir, he absconds from the hospital.

Two years later, Prakash encounters Brij's father while coming out from the Delhi Airport. He tells Prakash that an acquaintance met Brij in Ajmer Sharif the previous week. Although the person did not recognize Brij's face, he could tell it was Brij for sure because he had a tattoo on his arm which read "Brij Bhushan Bhutto".

=== "Refugees" ===
Prakash has two children now, Anhad and Antara. One day during the Punjab insurgency, Prakash is approached by a beggar who gives him an envelope with his name on it, containing a letter and two close-ups of Anhad and Antara and asking him to contribute forty lakh rupees within 15 days to the Free Homeland Army for the War of Independence. Prakash moves to England with his family but months later he is approached once again by someone from the Free Homeland Army who invites him back to Punjab and gives him a letter which is a well-preserved copy of the letter that was given to him the previous year.

=== "Smart Aleck" ===
En route to Rawalpindi from Lahore to attend a conference, Prakash meets Jaffer Hussain who was a Barrister-at-Law at the Lahore High Court. Prakash expresses his interest in the reallocation of mental patients after the Partition and Jaffer starts discussing a similar exchange of prisoners and how under-trial Muslim prisoners charged with serious offenses opted for Pakistan. Jaffer tells the story of one of his clients, Ali, who was charged with murder and hailed from Faizabad, Uttar Pradesh.

In the end, we find out that Jaffer and Ali were in fact one person, Ram Avtar Mishra from Ayodhya who loved a Muslim girl named Mehrunnisa. He got a fake certificate saying that he had converted to Islam as there were high chances of getting acquitted in Pakistan due to lack of witnesses. Eventually, he was acquitted and he got a permit to visit India using a fake certificate that his mother was on the verge of death. He took the train to India but was stopped at the first station and told that the permit is no longer valid and now, he needs an Indian visa on a Pakistani passport to visit India.

=== "Three Passports" ===
Anhad Kohli, an Indian national, married a Pakistani woman named Siddique. Together they have a 3-year-old daughter named Sehrish who is a British citizen. The family plans to visit India for Diwali which is only about 3 weeks away. The visa officer tells Siddique that getting an invitation to a conference will increase her chances for getting the visa on time. Anhad asks a favor from his father Prakash who arranges for them to attend a conference in Jalandhar. Although Siddique gets a visa to visit only Jalandhar, she still goes to Chandigarh with Anhad and Sehrish to celebrate Diwali with Anhad's family.

=== "A Spy Named Gopal Punjabi" ===
Sami is a former ISI agent who lives in Rawalpindi with his family and tells the story of a spy named Gopal, a Punjabi, whose parents were killed during partition. He worked with the Intelligence Bureau of India and after working as a stenographer at the Indian High Commission in Pakistan, he worked on behalf of the Intelligence Bureau in Amritsar. He also joined the mental hospital and worked to identify Indian antecedents of mental patients who had strayed across the border and were returned to India.

One day, he crossed the border to meet an informer but was apprehended by the Rangers. On being caught he acted like a mentally ill person and he was pushed back into India. On returning, he was disowned by the Intelligence Bureau. After numerous attempts to try and connect with the IB office, he got frustrated and crossed the border again and on being caught, he asked to meet an officer from ISI and then joined ISI. He became a legend in Pakistan and led many successful operations and was responsible for killing many RAW agents. Sami goes on to tell that Gopal Punjabi led a team to Bangladesh 4 years after it was formed and died during that operation.

A year later while on his deathbed, Sami tells his wife Aalia that he himself is Gopal Punjabi.

=== "Rulda's Discharge" ===
Rulda is discharged from the Amritsar Mental Hospital in 1984 and is taken to Delhi to live with his nephew's family by one of his nephew's assistants. When they reach Hazrat Nizamuddin railway station, Delhi, the city is gripped in anti-Sikh riots. The assistant is killed by the mob and somehow Rulda manages to escapes the mob. He stops a taxi and asks the driver, "Is there a mental hospital in the city?"

== Themes ==
As the title states, the book contains stories about partition and its effects on mental health. Partition is not an event of the past rather a phenomenon that haunts people even today. The stories deal with both the Partition of India in 1947 and the 1984 Punjab insurgency. The author connects these two events and says that, "It made me realise that this partition of minds on communal lines can happen again, as it has so many times in the past."

== Reception ==
The book received mostly positive reviews with many critics comparing the stories with Manto's famous short-story Toba Tek Singh. Amandeep Sandhu feels that author's profession as a psychiatrist positions him "to uncover the trauma and psychoses that Partition caused in us as nations and in Punjab as a society." Farah Yameen from The Hindu Business Line, who reviewed the book thinking it was a novel and not a collection of short-stories, feels that the author has done injustice to his work and that he should have explored more on the question of hundreds of mental patients who died of cholera in asylums or how did the partition cause collective psychosis. She also complains about the clichéd cover of the book which displays a silhouette of a man with a tunnel going through it.

Ranjit Powar's review in The Tribune called the book a must read for those who should know what happened and those who still feel the phantom limb pain of Partition and have inherited the loss of unrequited relationships through a collective subconscious. Nirupama Dutt wrote in the Hindustan Times, "Psychiatrist Anirudh Kala's 'The Unsafe Asylum: Stories of Partition and Madness' in interlinked episodes explores the impact of Partition on mental health in both countries, and even of the future generations." Sakoon Singh reviews the book in DNA thus, "In a new offering, Anirudh Kala in The Unsafe Asylum: Stories of Partition and Madness, amplifies the voice of purported "lunatics". The naivety of "the rear end of humanity" duly punctures the sophistry of arguments advocating Partition. The book comes from the space of an insider, Kala's empathy drives this history from below. Overall, a sage addition to the existing and growing corpus of partition writing."
