= MagCulture =

Magazine shop in London

magCulture
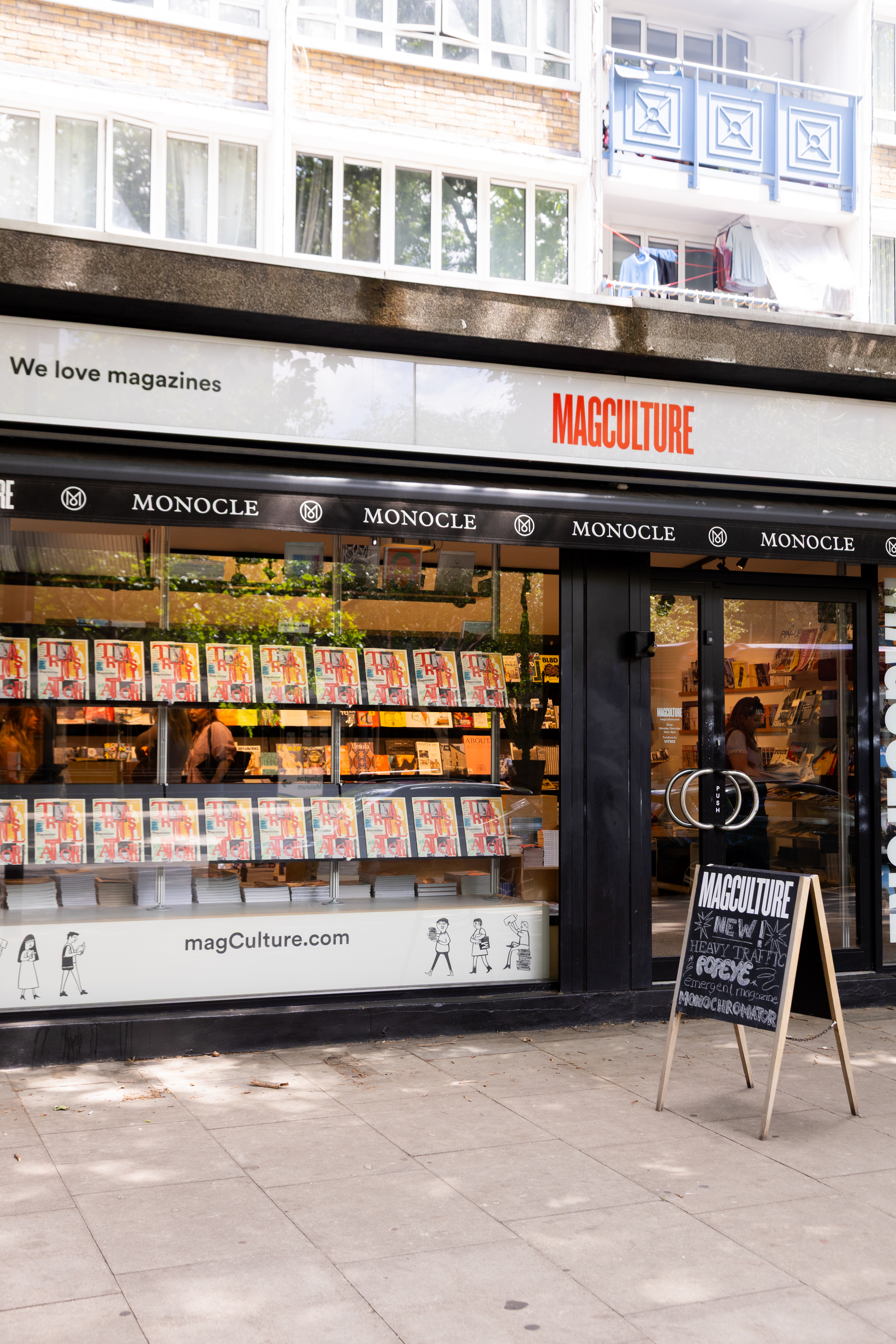
- Storefront in 2025

General information
- Location: 270 St John Street, London EC1V 4PE, United Kingdom
- Coordinates: 51.5266980085291°N 0.1035602298955559°W
- Opened: December 2015

magCulture is an online resource, editorial consultancy, events host, and magazine shop in the Clerkenwell area of London, England. It was founded as a blog by Jeremy Leslie in 2006, before adding a design studio in 2009 and the shop in 2015.

The Times called it one of the coolest newsagents in the city. Suitcase named it one of seven independent magazine stores to visit in the United Kingdom.

== History ==
In 2006, Leslie began magCulture as a blog; at the time, he had been working at John Brown as a creative director, with previous experience at Blitz and Time Out. The name was derived from his second book from 2003 titled magCulture: New Magazine Design. On the blog, Leslie spent a few years review magazines and writing about "current editorial design trends" up until 2009, when he expanded the magCulture name into an editorial consultancy working with publishers.

Since 2013, magCulture has additionally hosted two magCulture Live conferences per year: one in London, one in New York City. The idea for a conference originated from Leslie's book celebration for his 2013 title, The Modern Magazine.

On December 11, 2015, Leslie opened a 800-square-foot storefront in Clerkenwell, featuring furniture by Vitsœ, to highlight the new generation of independent magazines. The space's previous owner had been a newsagent. In addition to a shop, the space is designed to host events, such as the monthly magCulture Meets series where editors and art directors present the latest issues of their magazines.

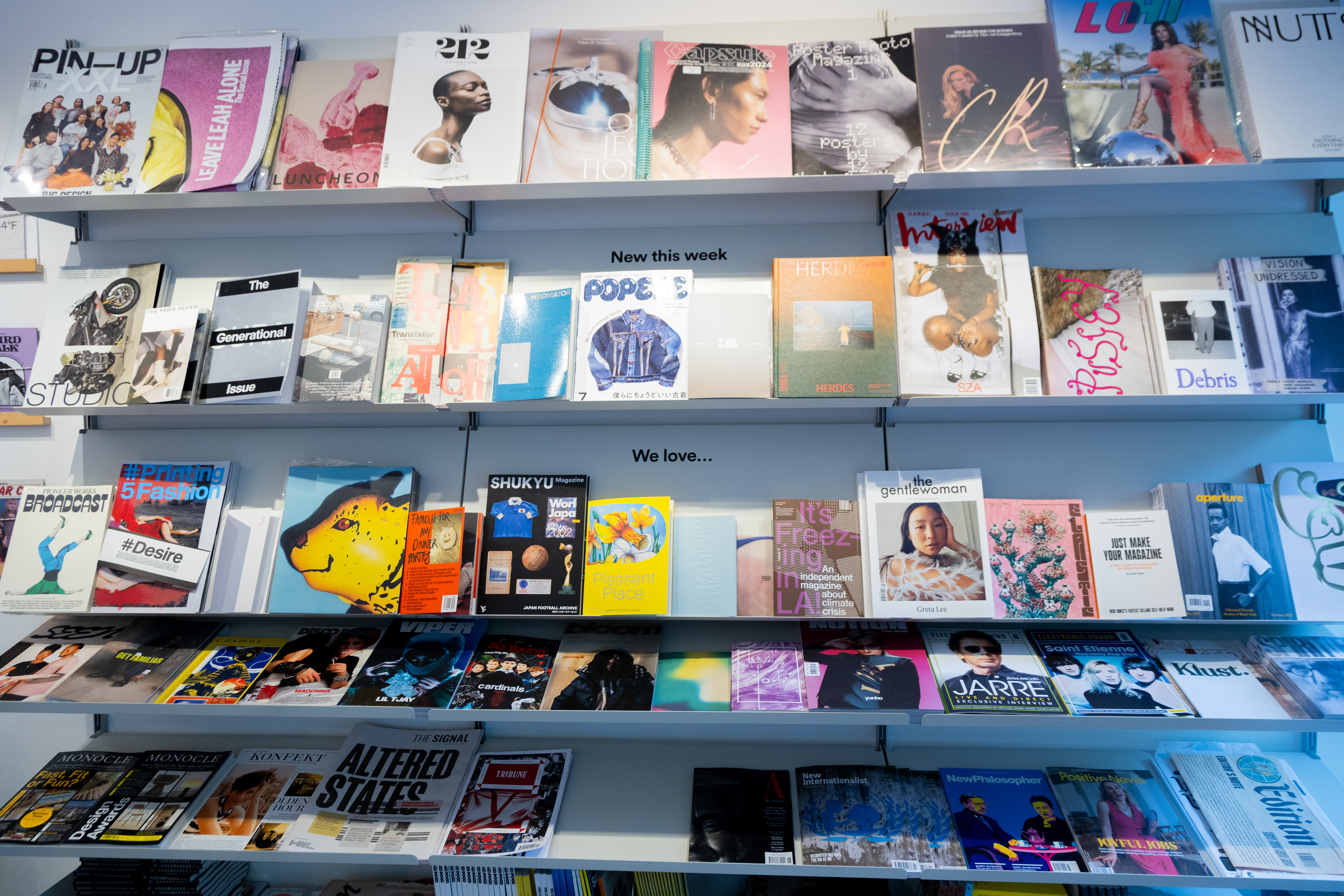
A shelf in the Clerkenwell shop.

== Collaborations ==
In 2020, magCulture collaborated with Junya Watanabe on a shirt, based on the shop’s black tote bag, for the latter's SS20 collection.
