= Jill Alexander Essbaum =

American poet, writer, and professor

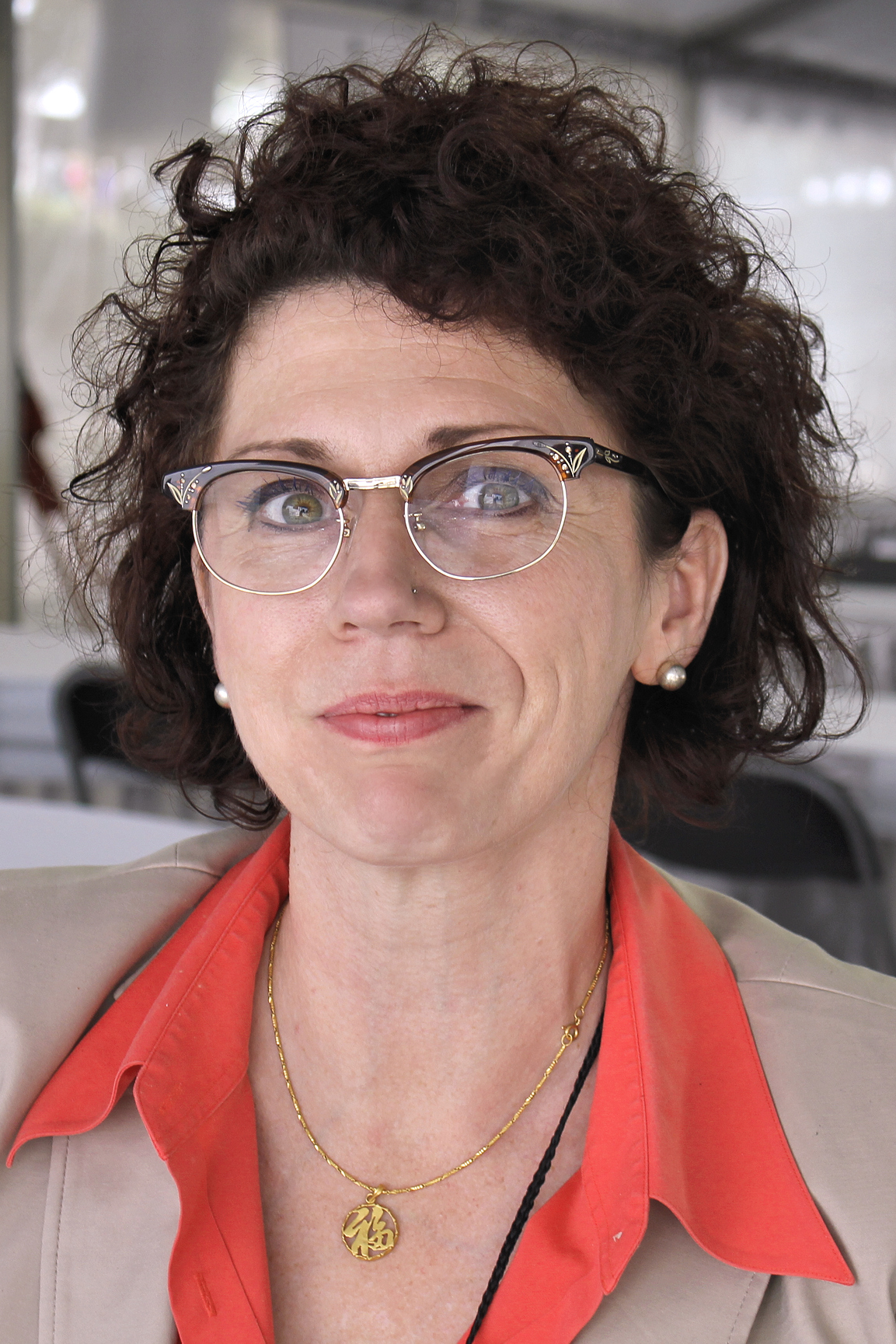
- Essbaum at the 2015 Texas Book Festival.
- Born: 1971 (age 54–55); Bay City, Texas, United States
- Occupations: Poet, novelist
- Writing career
- Language: English
- Years active: 2000–present

Jill Alexander Essbaum (born 1971 in Bay City, Texas, United States) is an American poet, writer, and professor. Her most recent collections are the full-length manuscripts Harlot (No Tell Motel, 2007) and Necropolis (neoNuma Arts, 2008). Essbaum's poetry features puns, wordplay and dark humor, often mixed with religious and erotic imagery. She currently teaches at the University of California Riverside Palm Desert Graduate Center in the Masters of Creative Writing Graduate Program. Essbaum's debut novel Hausfrau (Random House) was published in March, 2015.

== Critical response ==
Publishers Weekly notes, of Hausfrau:

"The realism of Anna’s dilemmas and the precise construction of the novel are marvels of the form, and Essbaum chooses her words carefully."

Agha Shahid Ali wrote:

"Only the best writers put us right at the site of myth and thus assert, for us, our right to be part of the beginning and end of any world, any heaven. That Jill Alexander Essbaum does it so quietly, so delicately, and puts herself, and us, at the center of Heaven itself leads me only to envy. For how else can one convincingly transcend the domestic? There is simply no self-congratulation in these poems. Just a graceful, magical way of taking oneself - and one's bare uncertainties - for granted.

Of Essbaum's work in general, the critic G.M. Palmer, on his literary blog Strong Verse, writes,

Dancing on the edge of her words one finds despair and salvation, often in the same word. She echoes Donne and Plath and riffs on Eliot but has the precise benefit of being alive and full of our time.

== Awards ==
- 1999 Bakeless Prize
- NEA Literature Grants, 2003 and 2013

== Published works ==
=== Poetry collections ===
- Heaven (Middlebury Press, 2000)
- Oh Forbidden (Pecan Grove Press, 2005)
- Harlot (No Tell Books, 2007)
- Necropolis (neoNuma Arts, 2008)

=== Chapbooks ===
- The Devastation (Cooper Dillon Books, 2009)

=== Novels ===
- Hausfrau (Random House, March 2015)

=== Anthologies ===
- The Bedside Guide to No Tell Motel (Lulu.com, 2006)
- The Best American Erotic Poems (Scribner 2008)
