= CPJ International Press Freedom Awards =

American journalism award

International Press Freedom Awards
- Awarded for: courage in defending press freedom in the face of attacks, threats or imprisonment
- Location: New York City
- Country: United States
- Presented by: Committee to Protect Journalists (CPJ)
- First award: 1991
- Website: Awards website

The CPJ International Press Freedom Awards honor journalists or their publications around the world who show courage in defending press freedom despite facing attacks, threats, or imprisonment. Established in 1991, the awards are administered by the Committee to Protect Journalists (CPJ), an independent, non-governmental organization based in New York City. In addition to recognizing individuals, the organization seeks to focus local and international media coverage on countries where violations of press freedom are particularly serious.

Every November four to seven individuals or publications are honored at a banquet in New York City and given an award. The ceremony also honors the winner of the Burton Benjamin Memorial Award for "lifelong work to advance press freedom". Past hosts have included crime correspondent and former hostage Terry A. Anderson, Amanpour host Christiane Amanpour, and NBC Nightly News anchors Brian Williams and Tom Brokaw. In 1998, the ceremony was briefly disrupted by protesters who unfurled a banner calling for the release of former Black Panther Mumia Abu-Jamal from Pennsylvania's death row.

== History ==
The first awards were given in 1991 to American photojournalist Bill Foley and his wife, journalist Cary Vaughan; Cameroonian reporter Pius Njawé; Chinese dissidents Wang Juntao and Chen Ziming; Russian television news anchor Tatyana Mitkova; and Guatemalan reporter Byron Barrera. In 2025, the organization awarded its thirty-fifth group of journalists. On three occasions, an award was also given to a news organization of which multiple staffers have been at risk: Tajikistan newspaper Navidi Vakhsh (1994), several reporters of which murdered during the 1992–1997 civil war; Guatemalan newspaper Siglo Veintiuno (1995), which was subject to police and army raids for its uncensored coverage of government corruption and human rights violations; and Turkish newspaper Özgür Gündem (1996), which was subject to a campaign of publication bans, assassinations, and arrests for its reporting on the conflict between the Turkish Armed Forces and the Kurdistan Workers' Party.

Occasionally, imprisoned laureates accept their awards at a later ceremony, such as China's Jiang Weiping, who was awarded in 2001 but attended the ceremony in 2009, and Azerbaijan's Eynulla Fatullayev, who was awarded in 2009 but attended the ceremony in 2011. Sri Lankan reporter J. S. Tissainayagam was also awarded in 2009 while imprisoned, but was released in time to attend the 2010 ceremony, quipping in his acceptance speech: "Ladies and gentlemen, my apologies for being late."

The award was given posthumously on three occasions: to David Kaplan, an ABC News producer killed by a sniper in Sarajevo in 1992; to Paul Klebnikov, a Russian Forbes journalist shot to death in 2004 by unknown attackers; and to Atwar Bahjat, an Iraqi journalist for Al Arabiya who was abducted and murdered in February 2006. A number of other laureates had been threatened or attacked in the year preceding their award, such as Guatemalan journalist Byron Barrera (1991), whose wife was murdered in an attack on their car, and Željko Kopanja (2000), who lost his legs in a car bomb. Other laureates have been killed after their awards, such as Irish crime reporter Veronica Guerin (1995), awarded a year before her murder, and Palestinian cameraman Mazen Dana (1991), awarded two years before being fatally shot by a US soldier in Iraq. Eritrean journalist Fesshaye Yohannes (2002) died while still imprisoned; owing to conflicting reports and the secrecy of his confinement, the cause and year of his death remain unclear.

== Recipients ==
This list includes the recipients of the award as recorded at the official CPJ website. It is sortable by year, name, and country; owing to naming conventions in different countries, not all names are sorted by last name. Names in italics are publications which have received the award.

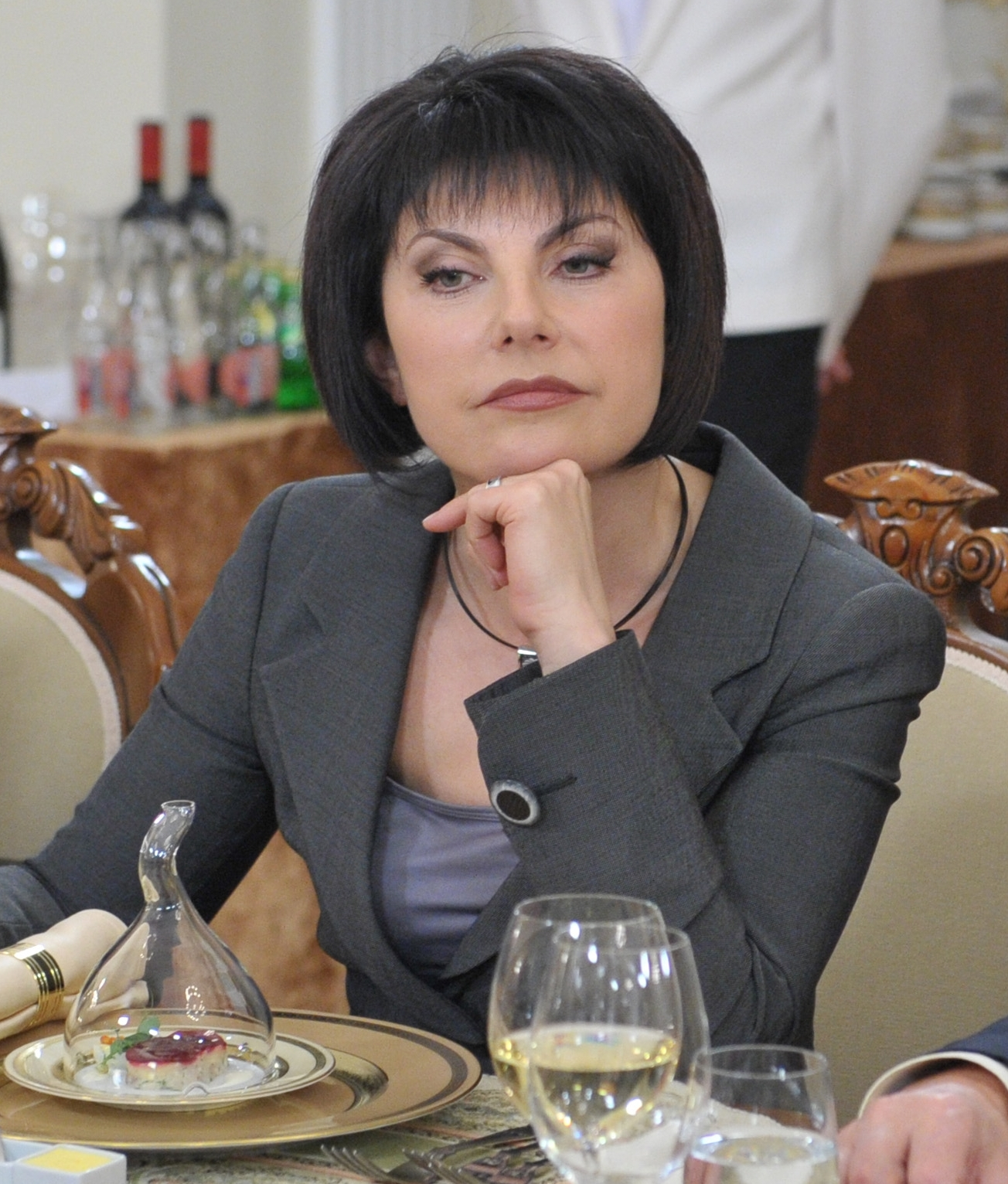
1991 recipient Tatyana Mitkova

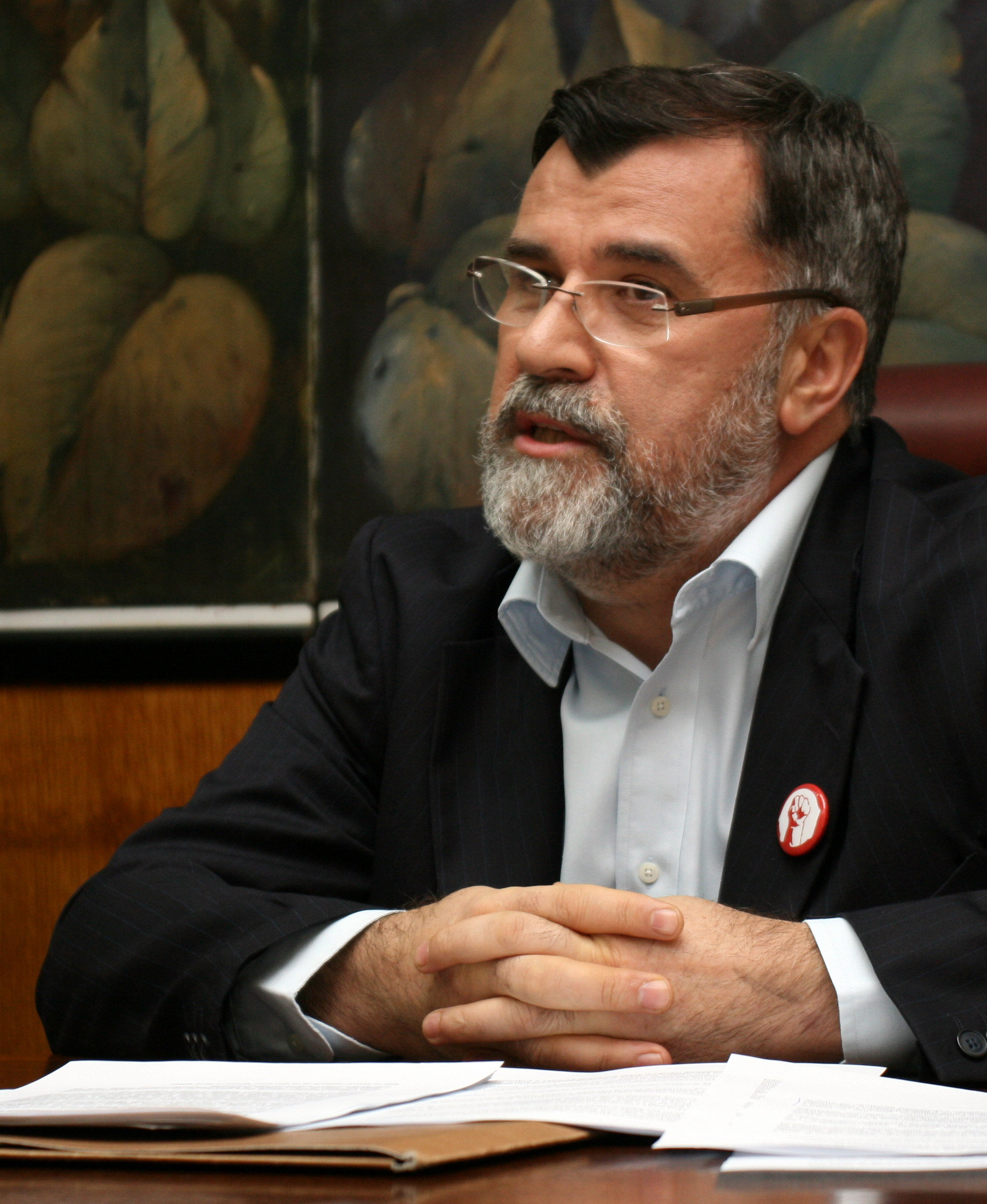
1993 recipient Veran Matić

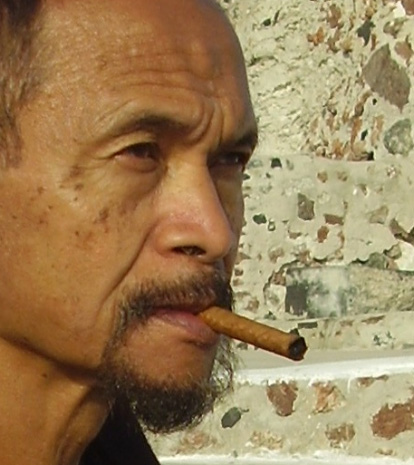
1998 recipient Goenawan Mohamad

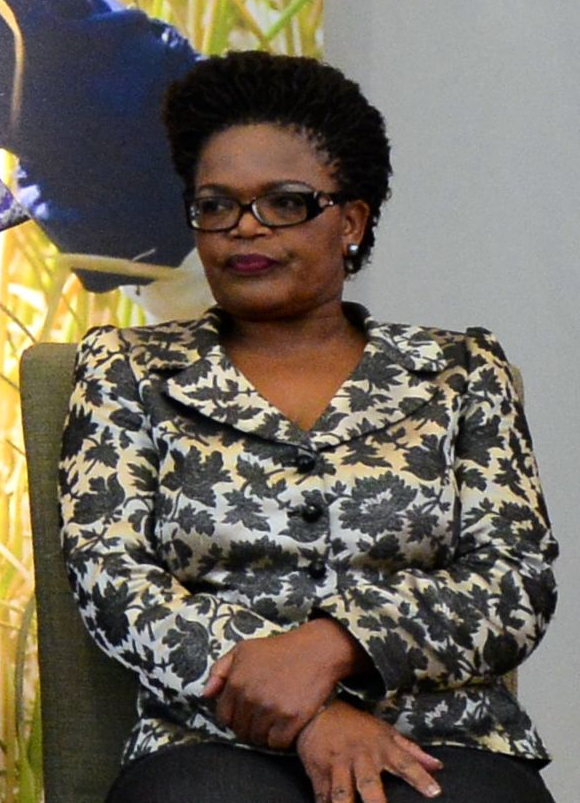
2005 recipient Beatrice Mtetwa

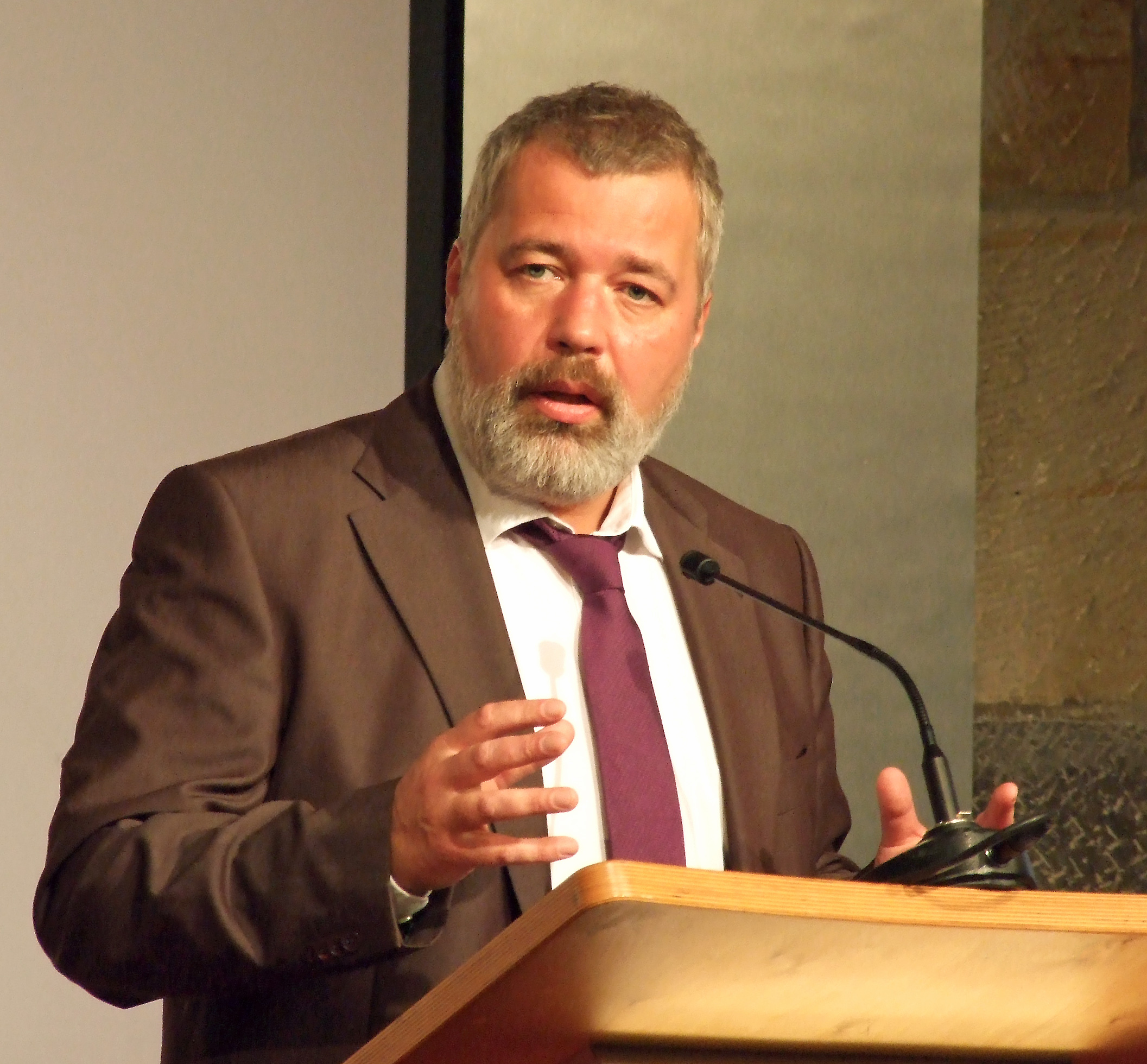
2007 recipient Dmitry Muratov

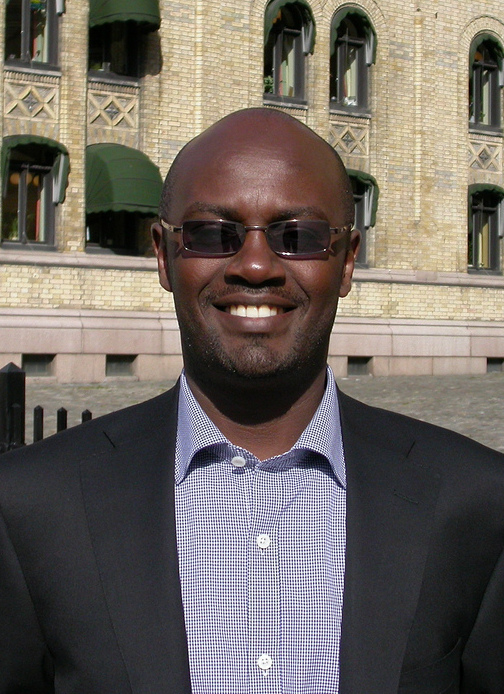
2008 recipient Andrew Mwenda

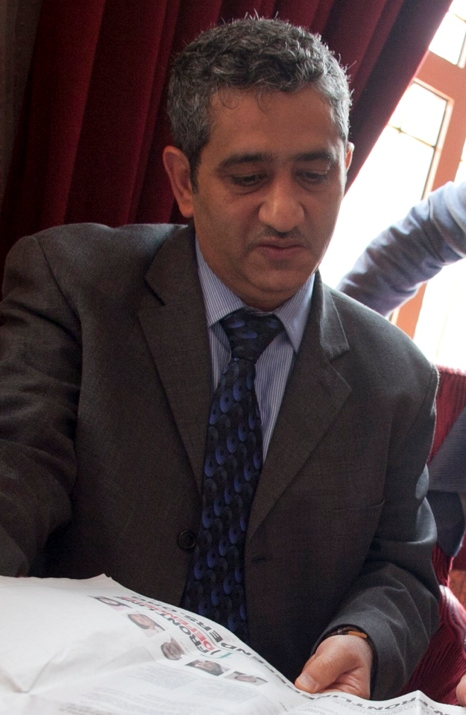
2011 recipient Mansoor Al-Jamri

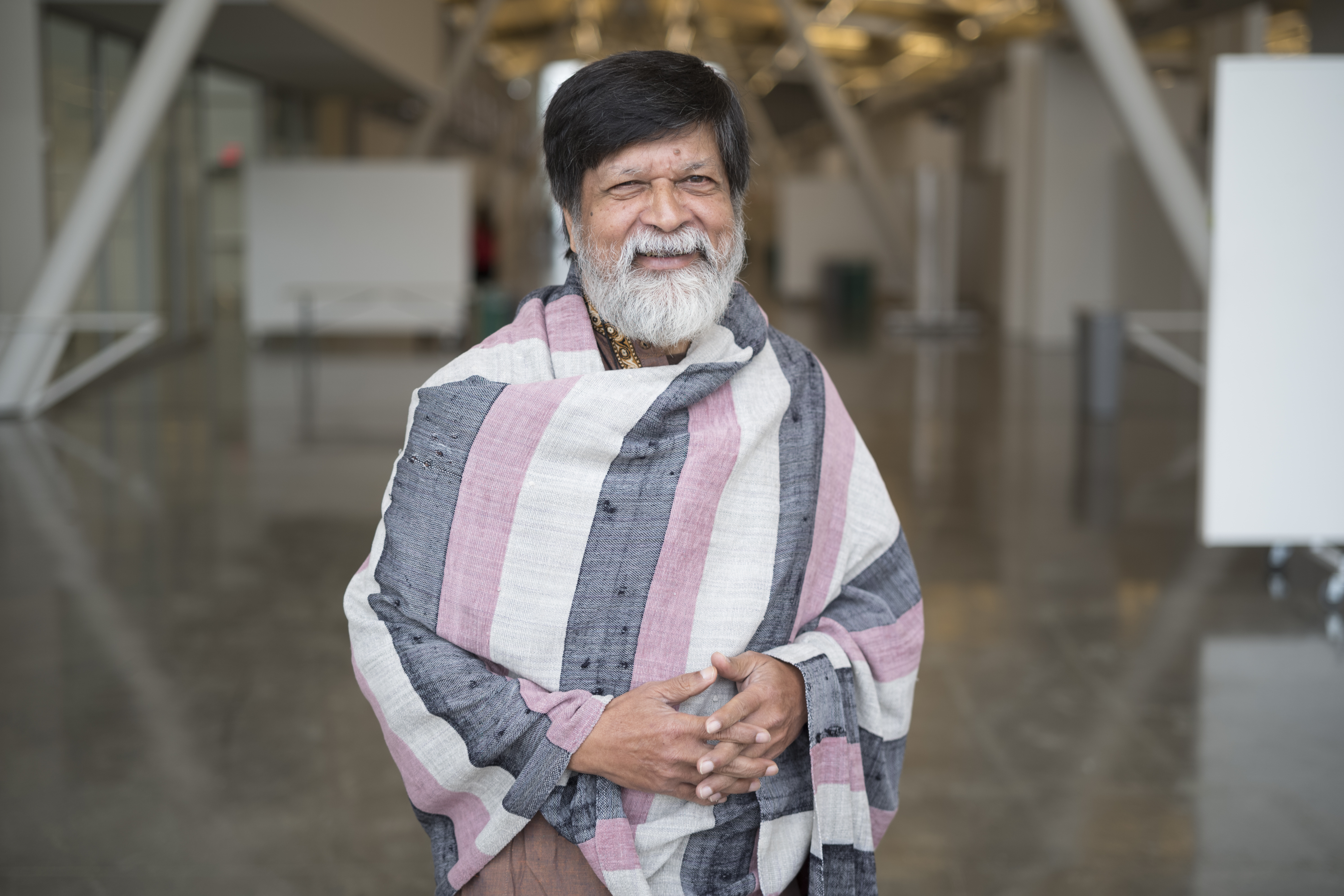
2020 recipient Shahidul Alam

Key
†	Award received posthumously

Recipients by year and country
Year	Honorees	Country	Ref.
1991	Bill Foley and Cary Vaughan	United States	
1991	Pius Njawé	Cameroon	
1991	Wang Juntao and Chen Ziming	China	
1991	Tatyana Mitkova	Russia	
1991	Byron Barrera	Guatemala	
1992	David Kaplan †	United States	
1992	Mohammed Al-Sager	Kuwait	
1992	Sony Esteus	Haiti	
1992	Gwendolyn Lister	Namibia	
1992	Thepchai Yong	Thailand	
1993	Omar Belhouchet	Algeria	
1993	Đoàn Viết Hoạt	Vietnam	
1993	Nosa Igiebor	Nigeria	
1993	Veran Matić	Serbia	
1993	Ricardo Uceda	Peru	
1994	Iqbal Athas	Sri Lanka	
1994	Aziz Nesin	Turkey	
1994	Yndamiro Restano	Cuba	
1994	Daisy Li Yuet-Wah	Hong Kong	
1994	Navidi Vakhsh	Tajikistan	
1995	Yevgeny Kiselyov	Russia	
1995	José Rubén Zamora Marroquín and Siglo Veintiuno	Guatemala	
1995	Fred M'membe	Zambia	
1995	Ahmad Taufik	Indonesia	
1995	Veronica Guerin	Ireland	
1996	Yusuf Jameel	India	
1996	Jesús Blancornelas	Mexico	
1996	Daoud Kuttab	Palestine	
1996	Ocak Işık Yurtçu and Özgür Gündem	Turkey	
1997	Christine Anyanwu	Nigeria	
1997	Ying Chan and Shieh Chung-liang	Hong Kong, China, Republic of China (Taiwan)	
1997	Freedom Neruda	Ivory Coast	
1997	Viktor Ivančić	Croatia	
1997	Yelena Masyuk	Russia	
1998	Grémah Boucar	Niger	
1998	Gustavo Gorriti	Peru	
1998	Goenawan Mohamad	Indonesia	
1998	Pavel Sheremet	Belarus	
1998	Ruth Simon	Eritrea	
1999	Jesús Joel Díaz Hernández	Cuba	
1999	Jesús Barraza Zavala	Mexico	
1999	Baton Haxhiu	Kosovo	
1999	Jugnu Mohsin and Najam Sethi	Pakistan	
1999	María Cristina Caballero	Colombia	
2000	Željko Kopanja	Bosnia and Herzegovina	
2000	Modeste Mutinga	Democratic Republic of the Congo	
2000	Steven Gan	Malaysia	
2000	Mashallah Shamsolvaezin	Iran	
2001	Jiang Weiping	China	
2001	Geoffrey Nyarota	Zimbabwe	
2001	Horacio Verbitsky	Argentina	
2001	Mazen Dana	Palestine	
2002	Ignacio Gómez	Colombia	
2002	Tipu Sultan	Bangladesh	
2002	Irina Petrushova	Kazakhstan	
2002	Fesshaye Yohannes	Eritrea	
2003	Abdul Samay Hamed	Afghanistan	
2003	Aboubakr Jamaï	Morocco	
2003	Musa Muradov	Russia	
2003	Manuel Vázquez Portal	Cuba	
2004	Svetlana Kalinkina	Belarus	
2004	Aung Pwint and Thaung Tun	Burma	
2004	Alexis Sinduhije	Burundi	
2004	Paul Klebnikov †	United States	
2005	Galima Bukharbaeva	Uzbekistan	
2005	Beatrice Mtetwa	Zimbabwe	
2005	Lúcio Flávio Pinto	Brazil	
2005	Shi Tao	China	
2006	Jesús Abad Colorado	Colombia	
2006	Jamal Amer	Yemen	
2006	Madi Ceesay	Gambia	
2006	Atwar Bahjat †	Iraq	
2007	Mazhar Abbas	Pakistan	
2007	Dmitry Muratov	Russia	
2007	Adela Navarro Bello	Mexico	
2007	Gao Qinrong	China	
2008	Bilal Hussein	Iraq	
2008	Danish Karokhel and Farida Nekzad	Afghanistan	
2008	Andrew Mwenda	Uganda	
2008	Héctor Maseda Gutiérrez	Cuba	
2009	Mustafa Haji Abdinur	Somalia	
2009	Naziha Réjiba	Tunisia	
2009	Eynulla Fatullayev	Azerbaijan	
2009	J. S. Tissainayagam	Sri Lanka	
2010	Mohammad Davari	Iran	
2010	Nadira Isayeva	Russia	
2010	Dawit Kebede	Ethiopia	
2010	Laureano Márquez	Venezuela	
2011	Mansoor al-Jamri	Bahrain	
2011	Natalya Radina	Belarus	
2011	Javier Valdez Cárdenas	Mexico	
2011	Umar Cheema	Pakistan	
2012	Mauri König	Brazil	
2012	Dhondup Wangchen	China	
2012	Azimzhan Askarov	Kyrgyzstan	
2012	Mae Azango	Liberia	
2013	Janet Hinostroza	Ecuador	
2013	Bassem Youssef	Egypt	
2013	Nedim Şener	Turkey	
2013	Nguyễn Văn Hải	Vietnam	
2014	Mikhail Zygar	Russia	
2014	Ferial Haffajee	South Africa	
2014	Siamak Ghaderi	Iran	
2014	Aung Zaw	Burma	
2015	Zulkiflee Anwar Haque	Malaysia	
2015	Raqqa is Being Slaughtered Silently	Syria	
2015	Cándido Figueredo Ruíz	Paraguay	
2015	Zone 9 Bloggers	Ethiopia	
2016	Mahmoud Abou Zeid	Egypt	
2016	Malini Subramaniam	India	
2016	Can Dündar	Turkey	
2016	Óscar Martínez	El Salvador	
2017	Pravit Rojanaphruk	Thailand	
2017	Ahmed Abba	Cameroon	
2017	Patricia Mayorga	Mexico	
2017	Afrah Nasser	Yemen	
2018	Amal Habani	Sudan	
2018	Nguyen Ngoc Nhu Quynh	Vietnam	
2018	Luz Mely Reyes	Venezuela	
2018	Anastasia Stanko	Ukraine	
2019	Neha Dixit	India	
2019	Patrícia Campos Mello	Brazil	
2019	Lucía Pineda Ubau and Miguel Mora	Nicaragua	
2019	Maxence Melo Mubyazi	Tanzania	
2020	Shahidul Alam	Bangladesh	
2020	Mohammad Mosaed	Iran	
2020	Dapo Olorunyomi	Nigeria	
2020	Svetlana Prokopyeva	Russia	
2021	Katsiaryna Barysevich	Belarus	
2021	Anastasia Mejía	Guatemala	
2021	Matías Guente	Mozambique	
2021	Aye Chan Naing	Myanmar	
2022	Abraham Jiménez Enoa	Cuba	
2022	Niyaz Abdullah	Iraq	
2022	Sevgil Musayeva	Ukraine	
2022	Phạm Đoan Trang	Vietnam	
2023	Nika Gvaramia	Georgia	
2023	Shahina K. K.	India	
2023	María Teresa Montaño	Mexico	
2023	Ferdinand Ayité	Togo	
2024	Shrouq Al Aila	Palestine	
2024	Alsu Kurmasheva	United StatesRussia	
2024	Quimy de León	Guatemala	
2024	Samira Sabou	Niger	
2025	Dong Yuyu	China	
2025	Elvira del Pilar Nole and Juan Carlos Tito	Ecuador	
2025	Bolot Temirov	Kyrgyzstan	
2025	Sonia Dahmani	Tunisia	
2026	Christina Assi	Lebanon	
2026	The Eritrea 16	Eritrea	
2026	Szabolcs Panyi	Hungary	
2026	Estefany Rodríguez	Colombia	
2026	Sai Zaw Thaike	Myanmar	
