= Hinostroza =

Hinostroza is a surname. Notable people with the surname include:

- Hernán Hinostroza (born 1993), Peruvian footballer
- Janet Hinostroza, Ecuadorian journalist
- John Hinostroza (born 1980), Peruvian footballer
- Rodolfo Hinostroza (born 1941), Peruvian poet, writer, journalist, food critic and astrologer
- Vinnie Hinostroza (born 1994), American professional ice hockey player
