= Radio Selva =

Ecuadorian independent radio station

Ownership
- Owner: Juan Carlos Tito; Elvira del Pilar Nole

History
- First air date: 2001

Radio Selva is an Ecuadorian radio station serving the town of Baeza. In 2025, its co-founders, Juan Carlos Tito and Elvira del Pilar Nole, received the CPJ International Press Freedom Award for providing "vital, independent community news" despite ongoing threats to their lives from drug gangs.

== History ==
Tito established Radio Selva (lit. 'Jungle Radio') in 2001 to serve his hometown of Baeza, located in the Andean highlands in Napo Province, Ecuador. The town was located in a remote area and was not at that time served by any local media outlets; Radio Selva reported on local news and community issues for Baeza and Quijos Canton, where the town was located. Tito hosted the morning show, "Buenos días, América", while his wife, Elvira del Pilar Nole, served as a producer. Tito and Nole resided in Baeza with their two children.

In 2022, Tito and Nole began investigating drug trafficking in and around Baeza, triggered by an increase in rates of cocaine addiction among young people in the town. They interviewed parents and reported on locations where drug dealers gathered, in addition to identifying warehouses being used to store drugs by trafficking gangs. They also raised concerns that local politicians and police may have been involved in drug trafficking. In August 2023, Tito and Nole presented a file of their investigation to local authorities, who promptly discarded it.

Shortly after sharing their report, the family began receiving threats. Their home was burgled, and Tito was threatened by a man with a gun in front of his daughters. After being involved by an anonymous individual that they needed to leave Baeza within 24 hours, a non-governmental organisation relocated the family to another province in Ecuador, where Tito and Nole continued to broadcast Radio Selva. In November 2023, the family were moved again to another city in Ecuador due to concerns that their location had been leaked when people on motorcycles began circling their home; in December 2023, they were relocated to a location in Colombia close to the Ecuadorian border.

In January 2024, an armed conflict broke out in Ecuador between the government and several organised crime groups, which prompted a rise in Ecuadorians fleeing to cities and towns across the border with Colombia, which led to Tito and Nole being relocated to another Colombian city further from the Ecuadorian border. In September 2024, the family were granted asylum in Canada.

As of 2025, Tito and Nole continue to broadcast Radio Selva from their home in Canada, producing two news programmes a day.

== Recognition ==
In 2025, Tito and Nole were named among the laureates for that year's CPJ International Press Freedom Award, alongside Dong Yuyu, Bolot Temirov and Sonia Dahmani.
