= Cándido Figueredo Ruíz =

Paraguayan journalist

- Occupation: Journalist
- Employer: ABC Color
- Notable work: Documentos confirman vínculo de los hermanos Acevedo con el clan Yamil
- Awards: CPJ's International Press Freedom Award

Cándido Figueredo Ruíz is a journalist for the Paraguayan newspaper ABC Color from Pedro Juan Caballero, Amambay Department, Paraguay. He has received multiple threats against his life for his work in exposing organized crime, drug smuggling across the Brazilian border, and corruption in Paraguay.

== Personal ==
Candido Figueredo Ruiz was born and raised in the town of Pedro Juan Caballero, Paraguay, where he continues to live and work while being hidden from criminals who want to kill him for exposing their operations. He his constantly receiving death threats from criminals who face scrutiny from authorities as a result of his reporting. The threats he has received has forced him to live in a house under full police custody and to carry a gun at his side for safety.

== Career ==
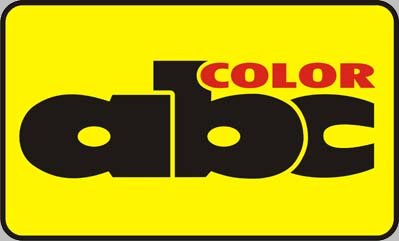
Candido Figueredo Ruiz works for the popular newspaper ABC Color in Paraguay

Candido Figueredo Ruiz worked for ABC Color as an investigative reporter. He has worked at ABC Color for 16 years.

== Notable works of journalism ==
Town of Pedro Juan Caballero, birthplace and residence of Candido Figueredo Ruizin, in Paraguay shown in relation to the capital city Asunción.

During his 16-year career at ABC Color, he has investigated and exposed criminal activity. He his most known for his years of investigating and reporting on Brazilian drug trafficking, and he exposed many of their operations due to his involvement. This story alone caused him to go into seclusion since many death threats were sent his way soon after his reporting. The escalation in protection was deemed necessary since many other journalists such as Pablo Medina were assassinated soon after reporting on criminal activity near Brazil.

== Context ==
Candido Figuerdo Ruiz, as well as many other reporters, worked for years exposing criminal operations in Brazil despite the danger involved. At least three journalists in Paraguay were murdered for revealing the intelligence they had on drug trafficking, sand mining, or any other criminal activity related to organized crime.

== Impact ==
Due to his reporting on cartels and drug traffickers, Candido Figueredo Ruiz has been forced to live a secluded life in his home town with constant police surveillance just to keep him safe from those he exposed. While he fears for his life, he told an audience upon receiving an award that he was honored for the recognition he has received and is glad that his reporting has done so much in the battle against drug dealing and drug trafficking.

== Awards ==
Candido Figueredo Ruiz was awarded with the 2015 CPJ International Press Freedom Award by the Committee to Protect Journalists for continuing to report on crime even after receiving threats. He attended this ceremony along with many other journalists from Syria, Ethiopia, and Malaysia who have accomplished similar feats in their careers.

== See also ==
- Human rights in Paraguay
