= Siamak (name) =

Siamak is a Persian masculine given name. Notable people with the name include:

== People ==
- Siamak Ansari (born 1968), Iranian actor and director
- Siamak Atlasi (1936–2021), Iranian actor and director
- Siamak Ghaderi (born 1967), Iranian journalist
- Siamak Ghahremani (born 1974), Iranian American cultural event producer and radio host
- Siamak Hariri (born 1958), Canadian architect
- Siamak Koohnavard (born 1984), Iranian football player
- Siamak Kouroshi (born 1989), Iranian football player
- Siamak Namazi (born 1971), Iranian-American businessman
- Siamak Nemati (born 1994), Iranian football player
- Siamak Pourzand (1931–2011), Iranian journalist and film critic
- Siamak Rahimpour (born 1963), Iranian football player
- Siamak Rahpeyk (born 1962), Iranian jurist
- Siamak Saleh-Farajzadeh (born 1977), Iranian Paralympic athlete
- Siamak Sarlak (born 1985), Iranian football player
- Siyamak More Sedgh (born 1965), Jewish Iranian politician and medical doctor
- Siamak Shayeghi (1954–2020), Iranian film director
- Siamak Varzideh (born 1970), Iranian boxer
- Siamak Yasemi (1925–1994), Iranian director, screenwriter, producer, and poet
- Siamak Yassemi, Iranian mathematician and academic
- Syamak Zafarzadeh (born 1964), Iranian cyclist

== Fictional characters ==
- Siamak, character in the epic poem Shahnameh written by Ferdowsi
- Siamak Mustafai, one of the main characters in the 2005 movie Fremde Haut
