= Farida Nekzad =

Afghan journalist

Farida Nekzad (born November 1 1976) is a senior journalist and media trainer, who established the Center for the Protection of Afghan Women Journalists in Afghanistan (CPAWJ) in 2017. She led this organization until the return of the Taliban with their capture of Kabul on 15 August 2021.

== Early life ==
Born in Kabul, Afghanistan on November 1 1976, Nekzad has been interested in journalism since she was a teenager, and entered Kabul University to study. However, when the Taliban took over Afghanistan she was forced to flee to Pakistan for five years. During this time she spent some time studying journalism in India, gaining a degree from the Indian Institute of Mass Communication in New Delhi.

== Career ==
Nekzad returned to Afghanistan in 2001 to start her journalism career, working for several media outlets as an editor and producer. She began training other journalists from 2003, while also working as a staff reporter for IWPR.

Nekzad helped found the Pajhwok Afghan News independent news agency in 2004, and worked as its managing editor.

In 2017, Nekzad started the Center for the Protection of Afghan Women Journalists in Afghanistan (CPAWJ). She led this organization until the Taliban recaptured Kabul in August 2021, and she fled Afghanistan for Qatar with the assistance of the Committee to Protect Journalists.

Two weeks later, she left Afghanistan and started her work and education in Canada, joining Carlton University’s journalism school as “journalist-in-residence”. She started her master's program in journalism in 2022 and graduated with her masters in 2024.

Nekzad is the former vice president of the South Asia Free Media Association for the South Asia Media Commission.

== Awards and honors ==
Nekzad won the 2008 International Women's Media Foundation Courage in Journalism Award and an International Press Freedom Award from the Committee to Protect Journalists. The latter award is given for journalists who show courage in defending press freedom in the face of attacks, threats or imprisonment.

In 2014, she was awarded the "Prize for the Freedom and Future of the Media" of the Media Foundation of Sparkasse Leipzig public savings bank.

== Personal life ==
She is married to Rahimullah Samander and has one daughter.

== See also ==
- Danish Karokhel, director of Pajhwok Afghan News
