= Matías Guente =

Mozambican journalist and editor

- Occupation: Journalist
- Awards: CPJ International Press Freedom Award (2021)

Matías Guente is a Mozambican journalist. He is the Editor of Canal de Moçambique and its digital publication CanalMoz. Canal de Moçambique is an independent and investigative weekly newspaper. The newspaper office had been attacked for his independent coverage and for exposing high-profile corruption cases and Matías Guente has faced personal threats. He was awarded the CPJ International Press Freedom Award in 2021.
