= Lúcio Flávio Pinto =

Lúcio Flávio de Faria Pinto (born c. 1950) is a journalist who lives in Belém, Brazil. Formerly an employee of O Liberal, Brazil's largest media company, he later became the publisher and editor of the independent newsletter Jornal Pessoal. In more than 42 years of reporting, Pinto has reported on a number of sensitive or dangerous topics, including drug trafficking, deforestation by ranchers and loggers, and military, political, and corporate corruption. His reporting has led him to be the target of assault, death threats, and 33 lawsuits.

In 2005, he won an International Press Freedom Award from the Committee to Protect Journalists, a US-based NGO. In 2008, the Los Angeles Times described him as having the reputation of "an authoritative, stubbornly independent journalist who doesn't shrink from confronting some of Brazil's most potent interests".

== Career ==
Pinto was raised in a middle-class family in Santarém, Pará, Brazil. He began reporting when he was 16.

He spent the first half of his journalism career with the media company O Liberal, whose founder, Romulo Maiorana, was one of his best friends. Following Maiorana's death, however, Pinto left the paper in 1987 after it refused to publish a piece in which he stated that two businessmen were implicated in the assassination of former congressman Paulo Fonteles. He subsequently faced a number of lawsuits initiated by the company. In 2005, he published a story about O Liberal's various holdings, and was assaulted two days later in a restaurant by Maiorana's son, Ronaldo Maiorana, and two bodyguards. Maiorana punched Pinto, and the three men kicked him when he fell to the ground, as Maiorana shouted "If I don't kill you now, I'll kill you later!" The incident was caught on videotape. When managers from O Liberal were later put on trial for tax evasion, Pinto was given an injunction by a federal court against covering the case; Reporters Without Borders described it as an example of "abusive judicial procedures to censor journalists".

After leaving O Liberal, Pinto founded the bimonthly, 12-page independent magazine Jornal Pessoal. Published in a newsletter format with a subscription of 2,000, the magazine emulates I. F. Stone's Weekly, the 1960s self-published newsletter by US journalist I. F. Stone. Pinto refuses to accept advertising for the magazine, stating that it would compromise the magazine's independence.

Pinto also worked from 1974 to 1989 for O Estado de Sao Paulo.

== Personal life ==
Pinto is separated from his wife. He has four children. In 2008, the Los Angeles Times described him as living alone in "monastic devotion to his solitary labors".

== Awards and recognition ==
The Italian Archivio Disarmo awarded Pinto its International Golden Dove for Peace Award in 1997.

In 2005, Pinto won an International Press Freedom Award from the Committee to Protect Journalists, a US-based NGO. Because of the number of lawsuits pending against him, he declined to travel to New York City to receive the award in person, fearing a local judge would take the opportunity to jail him for missing a court date. His daughter received the award on his behalf.

== Books ==
- Amazônia, o anteato da destruição ("Amazonia: Before the Act of Destruction")
- Amazônia: no rastro do saque ("Amazonia: The Tracks of Looting")
- Carajás, o ataque ao coração da Amazônia ("Carajas: Attack at the Heart of the Amazon")
- Jari: toda a verdade sobre o projeto de Ludwig ("Jari: The Whole Truth About the Ludwig Project")
- Amazônia, a fronteira do caos ("Amazonia: The Frontier of Chaos")
- Amazônia, o século perdido ("Amazonia: The Forgotten Century")
- Internacionalização da Amazônia ("The Internationalization of the Amazon")
- Hidrelétricas na Amazônia ("Hydroelectric Dams in the Amazon")
- CVRD: a sigla do enclave na Amazônia
- Guerra amazônica ("Amazonian War")
- O jornalismo na linha de tiro ("Journalism on the Front Line")
- Contra o poder ("Against Power")
