= Ferdinand Ayité =

Togolese journalist

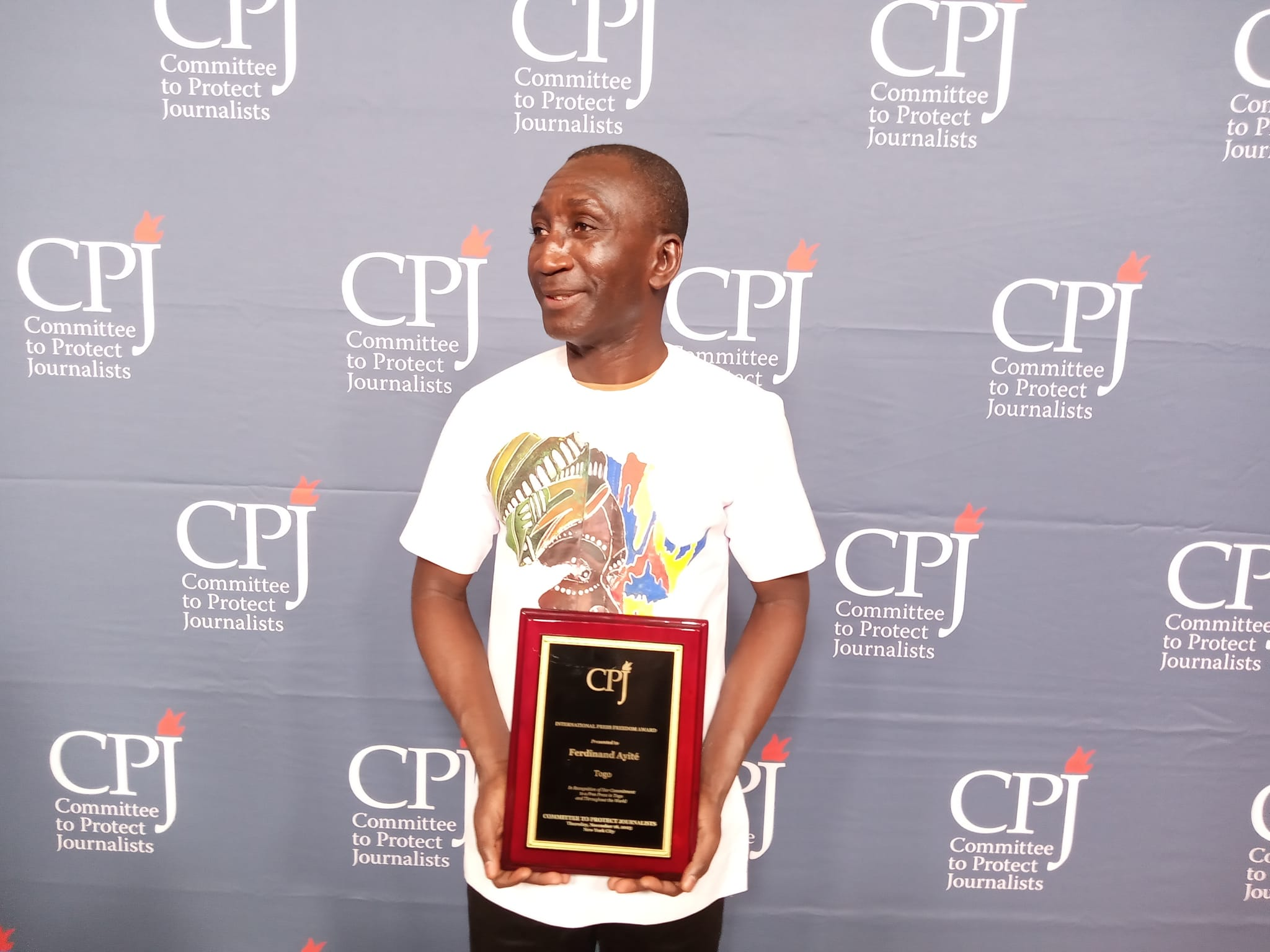
- Occupation: Journalist
- Awards: CPJ International Press Freedom Award (2023)

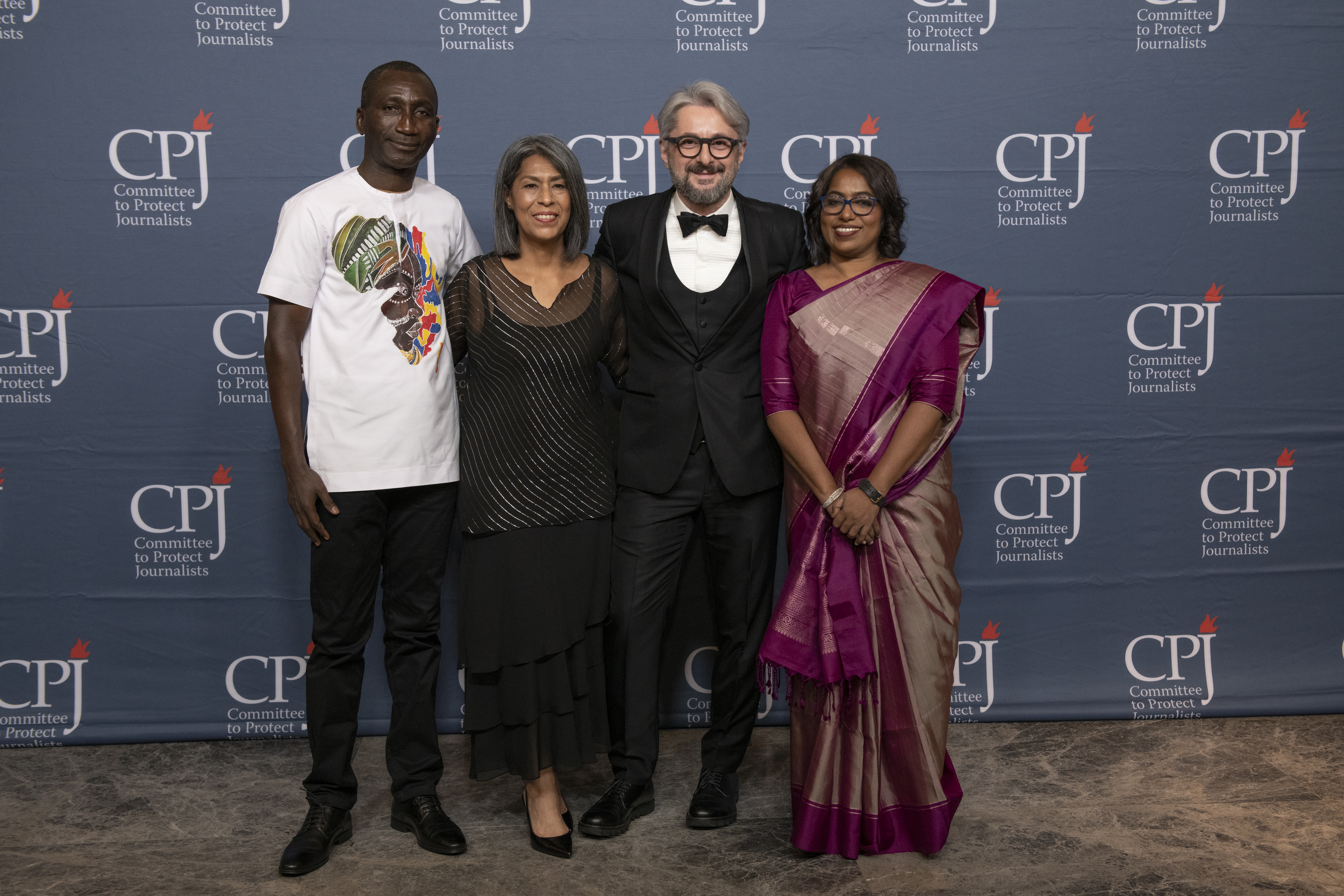
2023 International Press Freedom Awardees Ferdinand Ayité, María Teresa Montaño, Nika Gvaramia, and Shahina K. K. at CPJ's 2023 International Press Freedom Awards ceremony in New York City, on November 16, 2023.

Ferdinand Ayité is a Togolese journalist. He heads L’Alternative known for its investigative journalism. It has covered corruption and protests against the Government. He has faced personal and legal threats. He was awarded the CPJ International Press Freedom Award in 2023. In March of that year he left Togo just before being sentenced to three years in prison for a broadcast he made about government corruption.
