= Baeza, Ecuador =

Baeza
- Town
- Location within Ecuador
- Coordinates: 0°27′49″S 77°53′34″W
- Country: Ecuador
- Province: Napo Province
- Canton: Quijos Canton
- Demonym: baezeño/a
- Founded: May 14, 1559

Government
  - Mayor: Javier Vinveza Espinosa de los Manteros (2009-2014)

Area
  - Town: 1.58 km^{2} (0.61 sq mi)

Population (2022 census)
  - Town: 1,972
  - Density: 1,250/km^{2} (3,230/sq mi)
- Time zone: ECT
- Climate: Cfb
- Website: municipioquijos.gov.ec

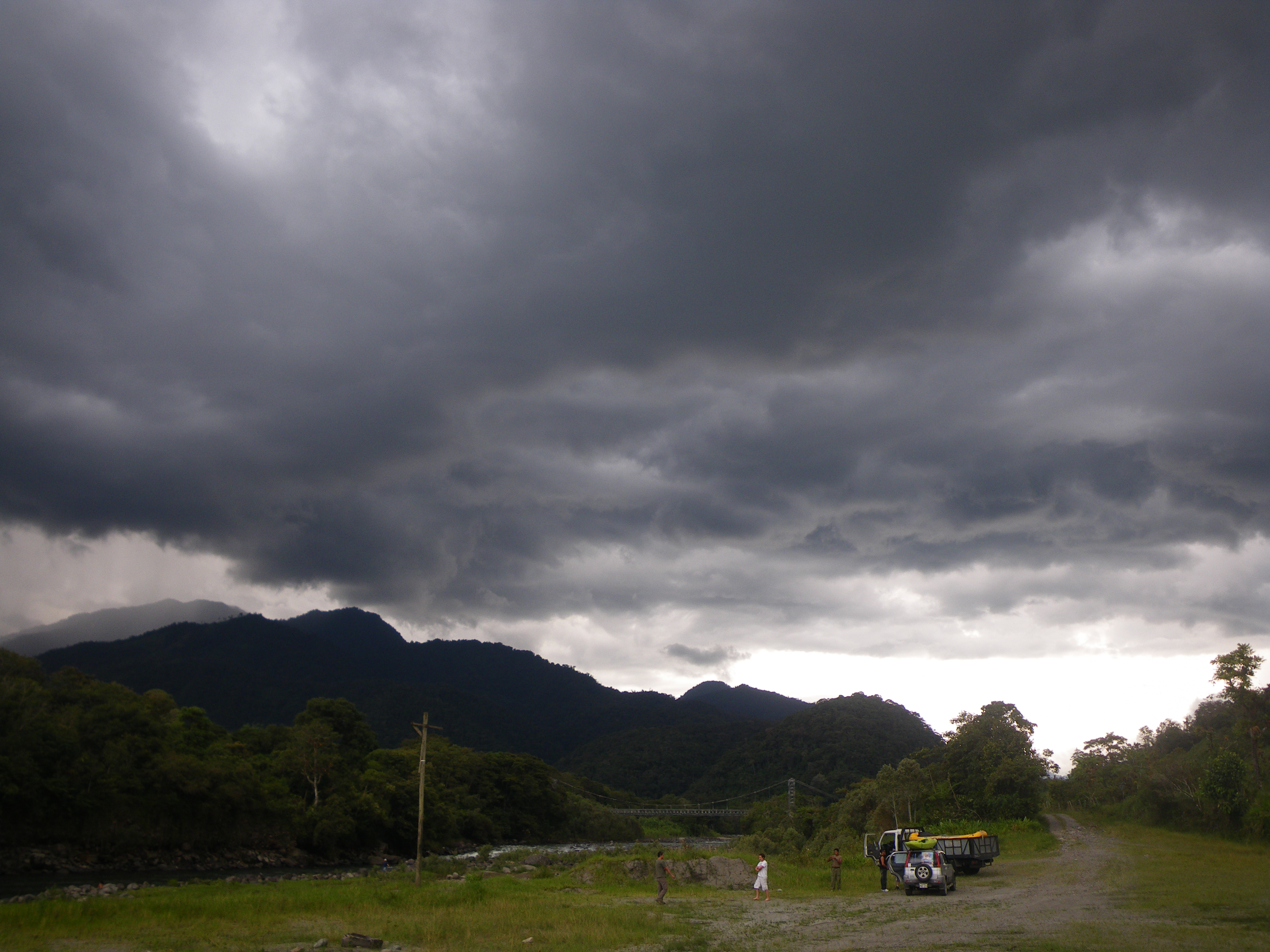
The Baeza area receives impressive thunderstorms throughout the year. Photo taken on 22 October 2011.

Baeza is a small town in — and canton seat of — Quijos Canton in Napo Province, Ecuador. It is the home of the Quijos-Quichua indigenous people. It is located near the Quijos river on South America.

== History ==
Baeza was founded on 14 May 1559 on the territory of the Quijos-Quichua people by the explorer Gil Ramírez Dávalos. During the 16th and 17th centuries, the town was one of the most important settlements in the Ecuadorian Amazon, but since the 19th century it has diminished in importance. Despite this, it remains one of the most important administrative, economic, financial and commercial centres of the Quijos Valley. The main economic activities of the city are livestock, agriculture and commerce.

== Climate ==
Baeza has a subtropical highland climate (Cfb) with mild weather year-round and heavy rainfall.

Climate data for Baeza
Month	Jan	Feb	Mar	Apr	May	Jun	Jul	Aug	Sep	Oct	Nov	Dec	Year
Mean daily maximum °C (°F)	23.8 (74.8)	23.6 (74.5)	23.6 (74.5)	23.4 (74.1)	23.6 (74.5)	22.9 (73.2)	22.8 (73.0)	23.3 (73.9)	23.9 (75.0)	24.2 (75.6)	24.1 (75.4)	24.1 (75.4)	23.6 (74.5)
Daily mean °C (°F)	17.7 (63.9)	17.7 (63.9)	17.7 (63.9)	17.7 (63.9)	17.7 (63.9)	17.1 (62.8)	16.8 (62.2)	16.9 (62.4)	17.4 (63.3)	17.9 (64.2)	17.9 (64.2)	17.9 (64.2)	17.5 (63.6)
Mean daily minimum °C (°F)	11.6 (52.9)	11.8 (53.2)	11.9 (53.4)	12.1 (53.8)	11.8 (53.2)	11.3 (52.3)	10.9 (51.6)	10.6 (51.1)	11.0 (51.8)	11.7 (53.1)	11.8 (53.2)	11.7 (53.1)	11.5 (52.7)
Average precipitation mm (inches)	127 (5.0)	154 (6.1)	204 (8.0)	264 (10.4)	223 (8.8)	244 (9.6)	212 (8.3)	161 (6.3)	183 (7.2)	151 (5.9)	167 (6.6)	130 (5.1)	2,220 (87.3)
Source: Climate-Data.org

== Media ==
Baeza is served by the independent radio station Radio Selva, established in 2001 by local residents Juan Carlos Tito and Elvira del Pilar Note. The two continue to broadcast the station from exile in Canada.
