= Patrícia Campos Mello =

Brazilian journalist

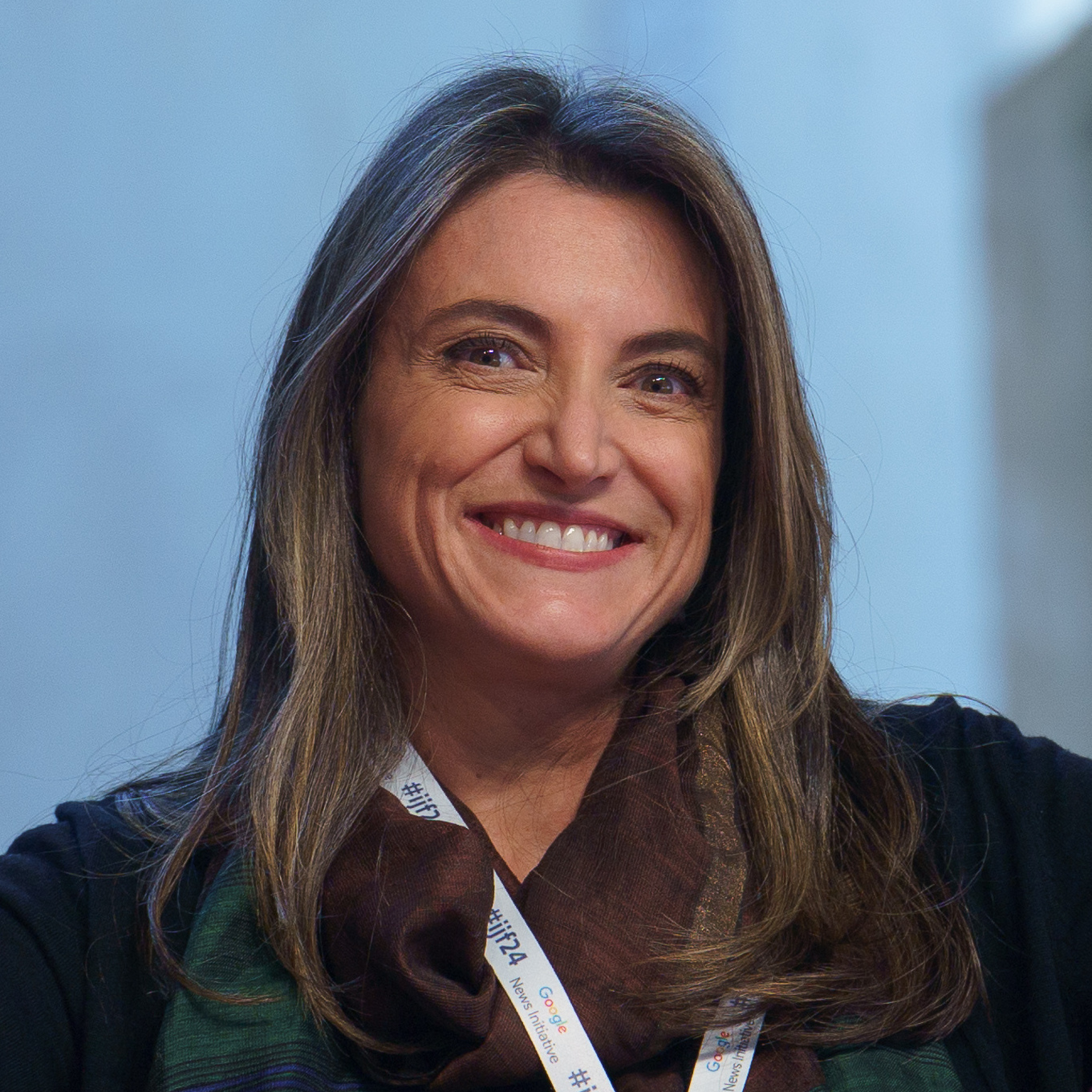
- Education: School of Communications and Arts
- Occupation: Journalist
- Awards: Woman Press Trophy; Premios Internacionales de Periodismo Rey de España (2018); CPJ International Press Freedom Awards (2019); Vladimir Herzog Award (2019); Time Person of the Year (2018)

Patrícia Campos Mello is a Brazilian journalist. She works at Folha de S.Paulo as a news reporter and columnist. In 2020, she received the Maria Moors Cabot Award, from Columbia University. In 2019, she received the International Press Freedom Award from the Committee to Protect Journalists. In 2018, she received the King of Spain International Journalism Award. And in 2020 she was awarded the Ordre National du Mérite by the government of France. In 2016, she received the Troféu Mulher Imprensa award.

In 2018, she published a series on a supposedly illegal financial scheme in support of Jair Bolsonaro’s candidature for the Presidency of Brazil, involving massive use of social media. In this context, she was targeted by hate messages on the internet. In 2018, the US news magazine Time selected "The Guardians and the War on Truth" as "Person of the Year", honoring investigative journalists worldwide. Mello was also explicitly mentioned in the tribute.

For her work, in 2019 she received the International Press Freedom Award from the Committee to Protect Journalists (CPJ). In 2017, she received the International Committee of the Red Cross (ICRC) Award. And in 2018, she received together with her team the King of Spain International Journalism Award and the V Petrobras Journalism Award.

She was reported from several conflict zones, such as Syria, Iraq, Libya, Afghanistan. She covered the 2014-2015 Ebola outbreak in Sierra Leone. She covered the 2020-2021 COVID-19 pandemic in Brazil, reporting from public hospitals and shelters. She is the author of the best-selling book "Máquina do Ódio - notas de uma repórter sobre fake news e violência digital", and "Lua de Mel em Kobane".

== Career ==
She has a degree in Journalism from USP and a Masters in Business and Economic Reporting from New York University, with a scholarship. She is the author of Lua de Mel em Kobane, a book published by Companhia das Letras e Índia She is the author of the best-selling book "Máquina do Ódio - notas de uma repórter sobre fake news e violência digital", and "Lua de mel em Kobane". She is a senior fellow at the Brazilian Center for International Relations (CEBRI).

== International coverage ==
From 2006 to 2010, she was a correspondent in Washington for the State of São Paulo. She covered the American economic crisis, the war in Afghanistan, the elections of 2008, 2012, 2016. At the White House, she interviewed President George W Bush. She also covered the attacks of 11 September 2001. She conceived the award-winning "World of Walls" project, a multimedia special about the migration crisis made in four continents.

She has been to Syria, Iraq, Turkey, Libya, Lebanon and Kenya several times reporting on refugees and the war. She was also the only Brazilian reporter who, in 2014 and 2015, covered the ebola epidemic in Sierra Leone.

=== 2018 Elections in Brazil ===
She gained prominence in the context of the 2018 presidential election in Brazil when she signed a report on alleged electoral crimes in the campaign of candidate Jair Bolsonaro. She published that there was illegal funding for the Bolsonaro campaign on social networks conducted by party entrepreneurs. For her report, she was the target of persecution and hate attacks. Subsequently, in response to a questioning by the Supreme Electoral Court, statements from major social networks claimed that the Bolsonaro campaign did not buy content boost. However, these same social networks refused to provide information on the financing of content boost by entrepreneurs and companies linked to Bolsonaro, the subject of the article by Mello. In June, she published two more reports on the use of WhatsApp during the elections, this time with foreign marketing agencies. In July, nine months after the opening of investigations into the illegal use of WhatsApp shots in the 2018 election, not a single suspect had been heard by the police. In September 2019, almost a year after the election campaign, WhatsApp admitted for the first time that the 2018 Brazilian election had illegal use of massive messaging, with automated systems hired from companies.

=== Case Jair Bolsonaro ===
On 18 February 2020, during an interview with a group of sympathizers in front of the Dawn Palace, Bolsonaro insulted the journalist with a sexual innuendo: "She wanted to give the scoop at any price against me."

The statement to CPMI to which the president referred was from Hans River do Rio Nascimento, who worked for Yacows, a company specializing in digital marketing, during the 2018 election campaign. Several parties and politicians and journalistic entities, who considered the speech an attack on democracy, repudiated the president's attitude.
