= David Kaplan (producer) =

American television producer

- Born: c. 1947
- Died: August 13, 1992 (aged 44–45); Sarajevo, Bosnia and Herzegovina
- Occupation: Television news producer
- Organization: ABC News
- Known for: Death in Yugoslav Wars
- Spouse: Sally
- Awards: CPJ International Press Freedom Award (1992)

David Kaplan (c. 1947 – August 13, 1992) was an American television producer for ABC News, killed while his team was covering the Yugoslav Wars.

On August 13, 1992, on his first day in former Yugoslavia, he was struck by a sniper's bullet near the Sarajevo Airport while driving through Sniper Alley. His team had arrived to interview Milan Panic, the new Yugoslav prime minister. When traveling with the prime minister, however, the armored United Nations car proved to be too small to hold everyone, and Kaplan was moved to a "soft-skinned" (unarmored) van of another television crew. Because Kaplan had no flak jacket, he was seated between two journalists who did.

A few minutes later, a bullet was fired through the tailgate of the van, between the taped letters "T" and "V". Kaplan was not wearing a flak jacket, and the bullet entered his back, severing an artery. He died hours later in a Sarajevo hospital. Kaplan was the first American citizen to be killed in the Yugoslav Wars. The shooter was unknown.

ABC News anchor Sam Donaldson, who had also been traveling in the motorcade, called Kaplan "a good man" who "understood the risks here". US presidential spokesman Marlin Fitzwater described Kaplan as "an honest, fair, talented and creative journalist" and called his death "a very sad and personal loss for all of us who've worked with David". ABC News President Roone Arledge praised Kaplan as a man who had "devoted his life to news and to this organization."

In October 1992, Kaplan was posthumously awarded the International Press Freedom Award of the Committee to Protect Journalists. His widow Sally accepted the award on his behalf. The following year, Sam Donaldson created a fellowship in Kaplan's name at the Missouri School of Journalism of the University of Missouri.
