= Patricia Mayorga =

Mexican journalist

- Occupation: Journalist
- Awards: CPJ International Press Freedom Award

Patricia Mayorga Ordóñez is a Mexican journalist. She works for Proceso, a news magazine based in Mexico City. During her career, she has highlighted human rights violations of indigenous peoples including forced disappearances. As a result, Mayorga was awarded the CPJ International Press Freedom Award in 2017.

== Career ==
Mayorga's journalism career in Mexico began in 2000 with a focus on health and education. This later developed into an interest in human rights issues, government corruption, and violence. She initially worked for El Heraldo, a daily in Ciudad Juárez, and El Diario. She became known for her work for the weekly magazine Proceso, in which she reported on human rights violations against indigenous communities in the Sierra Tarahumara, as well as on drug trafficking in Chihuahua.

Due to the focus of her journalism work with Miroslava Breach, Mayorga has received death threats and fled Chihuahua in 2017. Mayorga was awarded the CPJ International Press Freedom Award that same year. She dedicated her acceptance speech to Breach and Javier Valdez Cárdenas, another journalist who was murdered.
