= Afrah Nasser =

Yemeni journalist and researcher

- Occupation: Journalist
- Awards: International Press Freedom Award 2017

Afrah Nasser (Arabic: أفراح ناصر, romanized: Afrāḥ Nāṣir) is an independent Yemeni journalist, living in exile in Sweden since 2011. Her reporting on Yemen's political affairs has been published in international publications including the Huffington Post, CNN, Al Jazeera English and The National. In 2015 Arabian Business listed Nasser as the 15th most powerful Arab under 40.

Nasser won the Dawit Isaak Prize in 2014, and the Pennskaft Award in 2016. In 2017, she won the International Press Freedom Award from the Committee to Protect Journalists.
