= Fesshaye Yohannes =

Eritrean journalist

- Born: c. 1955
- Died: 2007
- Occupation: journalist
- Organization: Setit
- Awards: International Press Freedom Award (2002)

Fesshaye Yohannes (c. 1955 – 2007) was an Eritrean journalist who founded the weekly journal Setit and was a recipient of the Committee to Protect Journalists' 2002 International Press Freedom Award. Fesshaye was imprisoned without charges in September 2001, and died in government custody.

== Career ==
Fesshaye became a journalist in the early 1990s, after Eritrea gained its independence from Ethiopia. Previously, he had been a member of the guerrilla movement fighting for Eritrean independence in the Eritrean War of Independence. In 1994, he founded the weekly journal Setit, one of the country's first independent newspapers, named for the only Eritrean river to have water all year. Setit soon gained the largest circulation in Eritrea. The journal covered difficult and controversial topics, including poverty, prostitution, and the lack of resources for handicapped veterans of the Eritrean independence movement. In addition to his journalism, Fesshaye also worked as a playwright.

Setit's coverage angered Eritrean authorities, and in May 2001, Fesshaye asked the Committee to Protect Journalists for help creating a journalists' union to increase the freedom of the press and provide protection for Eritrean journalists. In September 2001, one week after the September 11 attacks, the Eritrean government closed every independent media outlet in the country under the pretext of fighting terrorism, and arrested many journalists. The National Assembly stated that "the private newspapers by their wanton irresponsibility had provoked the anger of the people who demanded that they be closed and sighed with relief when they were temporarily suspended." Fesshaye considered going into hiding, but decided that he could not abandon his fellow journalists.

== Imprisonment and death ==
Fesshaye was arrested and imprisoned. In May 2002, he and nine other imprisoned journalists began a hunger strike to protest their imprisonment, and were transferred to a secret jail at an unknown location where they had no contact with the outside world. The date of Fesshaye's death is disputed. While some sources state that he died on January 11, 2007, following a prolonged illness, exiled opposition party leader Adhanom Gebremariam reported that Fesshaye was found dead in his cell on December 13, 2002.

== See also ==
- Dawit Isaak, another imprisoned Setit journalist
