= Gao Qinrong =

Chinese journalist (born c. 1955)

- Occupation: journalist
- Known for: 1998-2006 imprisonment
- Spouse: Dui Maoying
- Awards: CPJ International Press Freedom Award (2007)

Gao Qinrong (Chinese: 高勤荣; pinyin: Gāo Qínróng; born c. 1955) is a Chinese journalist who was imprisoned for eight years after reporting on a fraudulent irrigation project in his home province of Shanxi. In 2007, he won the Committee to Protect Journalists' International Press Freedom Award.

Gao worked as a reporter for the Xinhua News Agency in Shanxi. In 1998, he reported in the Shanxi Youth Daily that officials in the city of Yuncheng had arranged a fake irrigation project worth US$35 million to improve their prospects for promotion. Initially circulated only with the Communist Party officials, the report soon drew national and international attention.

Gao was arrested on 4 December 1998. Ten days later, he was charged with crimes including embezzlement, fraud and pimping. On 28 December, he was found guilty in a secret trial and sentenced to a 12-year jail term.

Coverage of Gao's case brought renewed attention to the challenges facing Chinese journalists.

In prison, he ran a newspaper and was released early, in December 2006, having served eight years of his sentence. Chinese state media described his case as example of the authorities' willingness to battle corruption, with one newspaper stating: "That the local reporter Gao Qinrong was framed and imprisoned after revealing the frightful spectacle of local corruption is a highly irregular situation."

Gao is married to Dui Maoying, who lobbied officials for his release throughout his imprisonment.
