= Mazen Dana =

Palestinian journalist

- Born: 1962; Hebron, Jordan-occupied West Bank
- Died: 17 August 2003 (aged 40–41); Baghdad, Iraq
- Occupation: Cameraman
- Organization: Reuters
- Known for: High-risk journalism, 2003 shooting death by US Army
- Spouse: Suzan Dana
- Children: Four
- Awards: CPJ International Press Freedom Award (2001)

Mazen Dana (Arabic: مازن دعنا, romanized: Māzin Daʻnā; 1962 – 17 August 2003) was a Palestinian journalist who worked as a Reuters cameraman. He spent a decade covering the Israeli–Palestinian conflict in Hebron in the West Bank, for which he was awarded the 2001 International Press Freedom Award of the Committee to Protect Journalists. He was shot and killed by US soldiers in Baghdad, Iraq on 17 August 2003.

== Work in Hebron ==
Dana worked for Reuters for over ten years, mostly in his home town of Hebron in the West Bank. According to the Committee to Protect Journalists (CPJ), Dana was wounded several times in the course of his journalism. In May 2000, he was struck in the leg by an Israeli rubber bullet while filming Palestinian rock throwers. In July of that year, he was beaten into unconsciousness by Jewish settlers that he was attempting to film and had his head slammed in an ambulance door by an Israeli policeman. In October of that year, he was shot again in the leg.

By March 2003, Reuters had assigned Dana away from Hebron for his own safety. He told a reporter for PBS's Frontline, "My family is happy about this, but really, I'm not happy, because I like camera, and I like it here. When I want to leave camera, I want to leave it by myself, not be forced to leave it."

== Shooting by US Army ==
On 17 August 2003, Dana was shot and killed by a US Army soldier as he attempted to film a tank patrol outside Abu Ghraib prison in Baghdad during the Iraq War. The soldier mistook his camera for a rocket launcher and fired, hitting Dana four times in the chest. Though the soldiers then realized their mistake and called for medical aid, Dana died on the scene. He was the second Reuters cameraman to be killed in the conflict, and the seventeenth journalist to be killed.

The journalists with Dana described the soldiers' actions as negligent and "crazy". They stated the soldiers had seen them half an hour before the shooting and must have been aware that they were not insurgents. France 2's Stephan Breitner stated that, "We were all there for at least half an hour. They knew we were journalists. After they shot Mazen, they aimed their guns at us. I don't think it was an accident." A US Army spokesman called the incident "a terrible tragedy" and added, "I can assure you no one feels worse than the soldier who fired the shots."

Reuters chief executive Tom Glocer described the death as "hard to bear" and issued a statement "personally calling upon the highest levels of the U.S. government for a full and comprehensive investigation into this terrible tragedy". The Committee to Protect Journalists also wrote to US Defense Secretary Donald Rumsfeld calling for a full investigation. Reporters Without Borders secretary general Robert Menard criticized the US Army for its "blunders" and for its failure to launch serious inquiries into the killing of journalists.

The soldiers were cleared of any wrongdoing after a US Army investigation. The report stated that the incident was "tragic and regrettable", but that soldiers had had a "reasonable certainty" that Dana was about to fire on them. Reuters disputed the inquiry's conclusion, stating that the soldiers had failed to properly communicate.

== Family ==
Mazen Dana was married to Suzan Dana, with whom he had four children.

== Recognition ==
In 2001, Dana was the recipient of a CPJ International Press Freedom Award. The citation praised him for "covering one of the most dangerous beats in the world, the West Bank city of Hebron, where journalists are routinely targets of violence." In accepting the award, Dana said, "Words and images are a public trust. For this reason I will continue with my work regardless of the hardships, even if it costs me my life."
