= Aye Chan Naing =

Burmese broadcaster

Aye Chan Naing is co-founder, chief editor, and executive director of the Democratic Voice of Burma, an independent broadcaster in Myanmar. He was awarded the CPJ International Press Freedom Award in 2021.
