= Yusuf Jameel =

Kashmiri journalist (born 1958)

- Occupation: Journalist

Yusuf Jameel (born 3 March 1958) is a Kashmiri journalist known for his coverage of the Kashmir conflict, the disputed Himalayan region over which India and Pakistan have fought two of their three wars since independence from Britain in 1947. Kashmir. Jameel has written for BBC News, Reuters, Time, Voice of America, the New York Times, and the Indian newspapers Deccan Chronicle and the Asian Age. He received an International Press Freedom Award from the Committee to Protect Journalists in 1996, which recognised him as having had "to withstand pressure and attacks from all parties to the conflict in Kashmir".

== Early career ==
Jameel began working as a journalist in college for Aabshaar magazine. He went on to work for the Urdu paper Aftab before joining the Telegraph in 1983. In mid-1984, he also began working for the BBC and Reuters.

== Abduction and attacks ==
On 2 June 1990, Jameel was seized from his home by the Indian Army, taken to a base in the Kashmir conflict zone, and, based on what the officials later admitted to was incorrect information, questioned about his links to militants. After initially denying the detention, the army released him 30 hours later. Three of the army officers involved were later disciplined.

In two incidents in 1992, grenades were thrown at Jameel's home. In the same year, he was hospitalised after a beating by Indian security forces while trying to cover a protest march.

In September 1995, Asian News International cameraman Mushtaq Ali was killed when he opened a letter bomb addressed to Jameel, who was then working for the BBC. Jameel was injured in the attack. After the incident, he moved to London for a few months before returning to India. Though no one was ever arrested for the attack, it later surfaced that the bomb had been sent to him by army personnel. Jameel expressed disappointment in the BBC's response to the attack, saying that though he was taken to London for receiving treatment to his injuries they failed to keep the promise to compensate him financially. He was also barred from further reporting on Kashmir before firing him a year later.

== Awards and recognition ==
In 2006, he won the Best Journalist/Writer award from the South Asian Free Media Association (SAFMA).
