= Mohammad Mosaed =

Iranian activist and journalist

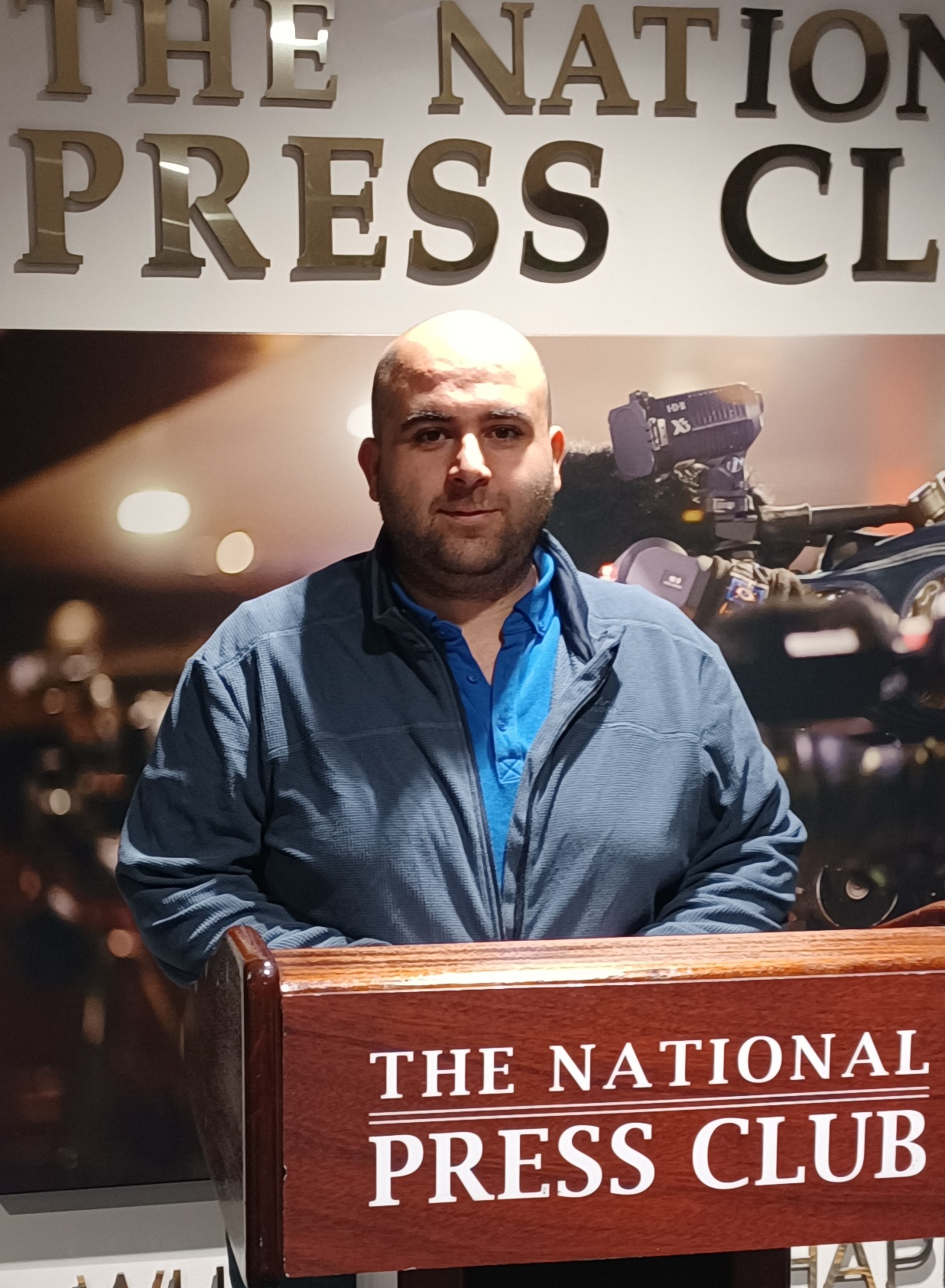
- Born: Gilan province, Iran
- Occupations: Political activist journalist
- Years active: 2008–

Mohammad Mosaed (Persian: محمد مساعد) is an Iranian activist and journalist from the city of Gilan. In November 2019, during the 2019–2020 Iranian protests and an internet blockade by the government, he posted a critical tweet, for which he was jailed for two weeks. He was released on bail. In February 2020 he was arrested again and detained for several hours for his social media activities, including having released tweets that were critical of the government's lack of preparedness in responding to the COVID-19 pandemic. On 25 August 2020, a week after he was charged with "colluding against national security" and "spreading propaganda against the system", he was sentenced by the Tehran Revolutionary Court to four years and nine months in prison, and was banned from conducting journalistim activities and from using all communications devices for two years. On Twitter, he wrote in response, "From the judge's point of view, my media activity has been smearing the country's name, inciting the public mind, and deconstructing." In January 2021, it was reported that he had been detained in Turkey where he had filed an application for international protection; Turkish security sources stated that he would remain in detention until his application had been decided.

Mosaed was one of the recipients of the 2020 Deutsche Welle Freedom of Speech Award in May 2020, and received a CPJ International Press Freedom Award in November 2020.
