= Mohammad Davari =

Iranian journalist

- Born: c. 1974
- Occupation: journalist
- Organization: Saham News
- Known for: 2009 arrest
- Political party: National Trust Party
- Awards: International Press Freedom Award (2010)

Mohammad Davari (Persian: محمد داوری; born c. 1974) is an Iranian journalist. After he documented abuses of prisoners at Kahrizak detention center, he was sentenced to five years in prison by the Iranian government, drawing international protest on his behalf.

== Early life ==
As a student, Davari volunteered to fight in the Iran-Iraq War, in which he was wounded in the eye and leg. He went on to become a journalist, acting as editor-in-chief for the Saham News, the news website of opposition presidential candidate Mehdi Karroubi.

In early 2009, Davari began to document abuses at Kahrizak detention center, videotaping statements from prisoners who alleged that they had been raped, abused, and tortured, and posting the interviews on Saham News. By July, the detention center was closed amid public uproar.

On 8 September 2009, however, Davari was arrested when authorities launched a series of raids on the offices of opposition leaders. The Saham News office was sealed, and authorities confiscated documents, computers, and photographs. Davari was later sentenced to five years' imprisonment for "mutiny against the regime", and transferred to Evin Prison. According to the International Campaign for Human Rights in Iran (ICHRI), he was then tortured in an attempt to make him testify against Karroubi. Davari's term was later increased by an additional year for his inability to pay a $5,000 fine levied against him for attending a teachers' union protest in 2006. In 2011, ICHRI reported that Davari's health was deteriorating due to the conditions of his confinement, and that he was suffering from severe depression.

Davari's imprisonment received international attention, with Amnesty International, Reporters Without Borders, and the Committee to Protect Journalists all issuing statements on his behalf. The Committee to Protect Journalists also awarded him the 2010 International Press Freedom Award, "an annual recognition of courageous journalism".
