= Ruth Simon =

Eritrean journalist

- Born: c. 1962
- Occupation: journalist
- Organization: Agence France-Presse
- Known for: 1997-98 imprisonment
- Awards: CPJ International Press Freedom Award (1998)

Ruth Simon (born c. 1962) is an Eritrean journalist.

== Early life ==
Simon worked with the Eritrean People's Liberation Front during the Eritrean War of Independence, heading its secret publications. She also served as editor-in-chief of the Association for the Reintegration of Eritrean Women Guerrilla Fighters magazine Bana.

After the war, she was arrested on 25 April 1997 by the Eritrean government while working as a correspondent for Agence France-Presse (AFP). The US-based Committee to Protect Journalists stated that she had been arrested for reporting an alleged statement by President Isaias Afewerki that Eritrean soldiers were fighting together with Sudanese rebel groups. The People's Front for Democracy and Justice, Afewerki's party, released a statement the day after her report calling it a "gross distortion" and stating that Eritrean forces were not participating in the Second Sudanese Civil War. Simon was the first journalist to be arrested in Eritrea since its independence four years before.

Simon was held without trial until May 1998, when Afewerki announced that the reporter would face trial and that Eritrea would sue AFP for spreading false information through a "so-called agent". The Paris-based Reporters Without Borders appealed on her behalf, as did the United Nations Working Group on Arbitrary Detention and CPJ. In November of that year, Simon was awarded a CPJ International Press Freedom Award in absentia, the first Eritrean to win the award. On 29 December 1998, Simon was released without ever having been tried.

Simon is divorced and has three children.
