= Ahmed Abba =

Cameroonian journalist

- Born: 1980 (age 45–46); Cameroon
- Citizenship: French
- Occupation: Journalist
- Years active: 16
- Organization: Radio France Internationale
- Known for: Wrongful Imprisonment, Award
- Awards: International Press Freedom Award

Ahmed Abba is a Cameroonian journalist, correspondent for the Hausa broadcast service operated by Radio France Internationale. He was questioned and detained for his reportage on Boko Haram and was incarcerated in Cameroon for 876 days. He was released in Yaoundé on December 22, 2017.

== Career ==
According to Radio France Internationale, the media outlet he worked for, Abba's reportage comprised issues surrounding refugee movement, political asylum and amnesty, assimilation, and society. His repertoire also included writing about Boko Haram's movement in West Africa, as well as their territory, strategies and beliefs, and most importantly, terrorist attacks.

== Arrest and trial ==
Abba was arrested en route from a press briefing in the Cameroonian city of Maroua, after having met with a local governor there on July 30, 2015. He was taken to the nation's capital, detained, and refused an attorney until October 19, nearly three months after the arrest. One news report also noted that Abba's legal statement was not recorded until November 13. This is illegal, as per both the English Common Law and the French Civil Law, legal systems followed in regions of Cameroon.

Abba's trial began on February 29 of 2016, where the Court charged him of "non-denunciation of terrorism," "laundering of the proceeds of terrorist acts," and "apologizing for acts of terrorism." The military tribunal acquitted Abba from this last one.

Due to an anti-terrorism law reintroduced in 2014, some organizations feared that Abba could face the death penalty. On April 6, 2016 the military prosecutor requested the death penalty. However, he changed his request days later to life imprisonment.

Nearly two months later, on April 24, he was sentenced to 10 years of incarceration and fined 55 million Central African francs, as per his lawyer, Clément Nakong. Abba appealed this sentence, according to his lawyer. After spending months in jail, Abba was summoned on August 17 to give his defense before the appeals court, which did not overturn his previous sentence.

== Release ==
On December 22, 2017, Abba was released from the Yaoundé prison in which he had been held for almost 29 months. His release was welcomed by journalists and press freedom advocates worldwide.

== Awards and recognition ==
On December 16, 2017, Abba was honored as an International Press Freedom Awardee by the Committee to Protect Journalists, at their annual convention in New York. His story and case were also spotlighted on the committee to Protect Journalists' special report on violence against journalists in Cameroon.
