= Mauri König =

Brazilian journalist

- Occupation: journalism
- Known for: reporting on sex trafficking
- Awards: Inter-American Press Association Award (2002); CPJ International Press Freedom Award (2012)

Mauri König is a Brazilian journalist who has won several international prizes for his work on human rights abuses. He holds a master's degree in "literary reportage".

== Journalism ==
He wrote a series of articles in 2000 and 2001 on Brazilian children being kidnapped for service in the military of Paraguay. Three men, allegedly from the Paraguayan police, assaulted him on 19 December 2000 after he photographed a police station in San Alberto. The attackers tortured him, whipping him with chains and strangling him, before leaving him for dead. However, König survived and continued to report on the story. He won a 2002 award from the Inter-American Press Association for one of the stories in the series that appeared in O Estado do Paraná. König was reportedly threatened again by local police in 2003 for his research along the Brazil–Paraguay border, and was finally forced to abandon the case.

Beginning in 2002, König served as a special reporter for Gazeta do Povo, a Curitiba-based daily newspaper. In 2004 and 2005, he continued to write about border sex-trafficking, and a leading trafficker was eventually arrested through König's research.

== Awards ==
In 2006, König was awarded the European Commission's Lorenzo Natali Journalism Prize, which recognizes "outstanding reporting on Human Rights, Democracy and Development issues". In 2012, he was awarded the International Press Freedom Award of the Committee to Protect Journalists, a US-based NGO. The award recognizes journalists who show courage in defending press freedom despite facing attacks, threats, or imprisonment.

As of 2012, König was a board member of the Brazilian Association of Investigative Journalists.

In 2013, Mauri König was awarded the Maria Moors Cabot Prize for outstanding reporting on Latin America and the Caribbean.
