= Svetlana Prokopyeva =

Russian journalist

- Светлана Прокопьева
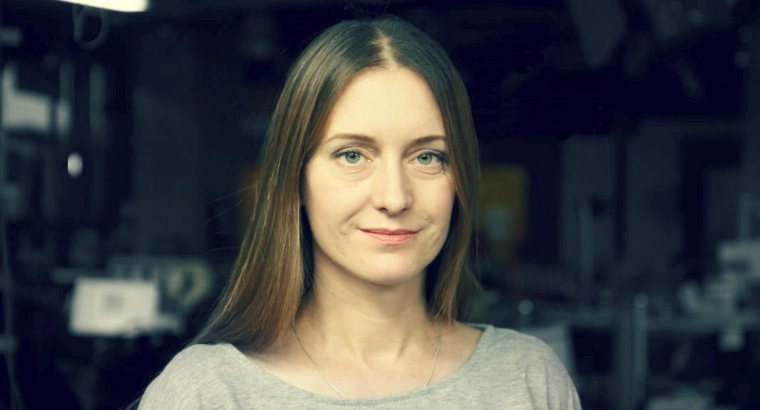
- Born: 1 October 1979 (age 46); Pskov, Russia
- Education: Pskov State University
- Occupation: Journalist
- Awards: CPJ International Press Freedom Award

Svetlana Vladimirovna Prokopyeva (Russian: Светлана Владимировна Прокопьева; born 1 October 1979) is a Russian journalist. She was awarded a CPJ International Press Freedom Award in November 2020.

== Journalism ==
Svetlana Prokopyeva worked for the local newspaper Pskovskaya Gubernia from 2002 to 2006. She also worked for the newspaper Pskovskya Pravda and the Echo of Moscow radio station in Pskov.

Currently, she is a correspondent for the Radio Free Europe/Radio Liberty (since 2014) and an editor of the Sever.Realii.

== 'Justifying terrorism' criminal case (2019–2020) ==
In 2018 Prokopyeva wrote an article where argued that Russian state authorities are partly to blame for the Arkhangelsk FSB office bombing. After that she was charged with 'justifying terrorism'. On 6 July 2020 she was found guilty and fined $7,000.

== Awards ==
Redkollegia media award.

She was awarded a CPJ International Press Freedom Award in November 2020.
