= Mustafa Haji Abdinur =

Somali journalist

Mustafa Haji Abdinur is a Somali journalist and radio correspondent. He was awarded a CPJ International Press Freedom Award by the Committee to Protect Journalists in 2009.

== Early life and education ==
Abdinur was born into a working-class family in the city of Baidoa, a small town south-west of Mogadishu. His father, who worked for the government, moved to Saudi Arabia in 1987, three years before the Somali civil war broke out. Several years after the collapse of the Somali military regime, Abdinur's family moved to Mogadishu. There, Abdinur completed his high school education. In 1995, he returned to Baidoa, where he studied English.

== Career ==
=== In Baidoa ===
Abdinur began to teach English in Baidoa, at the same institute where he had studied. While working as a teacher, he applied for a job as a program producer for Radio Baidoa, a small radio station in Baidoa. He successfully passed the examination and was hired to translate world news bulletins and documentaries broadcast by international news channels. Several months later, he began producing his programs, on topics including agriculture, livestock, and humanitarian crises. Abdinur also began to work as a newscaster and investigative reporter for Radio Baidoa and studied journalism at a private institute in Baidoa. Abdinur was forced to move to Mogadishu in 2001 after clashes between clan militias supporting local warlords erupted in Baidoa and disrupted his work. Armed militias took control of the Radio Baidoa building, closed the station, and ordered Abdinur to leave.

=== In Mogadishu ===
In Mogadishu, Abdinur continued to study information technology and media. In 2002, he joined the first Somali television and radio network (STN), launched by Somali businessmen after the civil war. He started producing business program and later became a newscaster at STN. During his stay with STN he continued to take journalism courses, becoming one of the few professional Somali journalists working in war torn Somalia.

In 2004, Abdinur joined Radio Shabelle, another independent radio station run by local businessmen. There, he worked as a producer and news editor.

In 2006, Abdinur led four Radio Shabelle journalists on a one-month assignment to cover the severe drought affecting the south and southwest regions of the country. His coverage drew attention from international aid agencies and the Somali community living outside the country, and led to humanitarian assistance for people affected by the drought.

In 2006, Abdinur also worked as the editor for the English page of the Shabelle Media Network, the only internationally sourced English page in Somalia at that time. The same year, he started contributing for the Agence France-Presse (AFP). He currently works as a Somalia correspondent for Agence France-Presse.

In 2007, Abdinur and a business partner started Radio Simba, which has over 2 million listeners across southern and central Somalia.

In late 2008, Abdinur had a motorbike accident as he was covering clashes between Ethiopian troops and Islamist insurgents in southern Mogadishu. He broke his knee, and was taken to a hospital in Kenya for surgery. While recovering, he took a UK-based long distance freelance journalism course.

In 2009, he won an International Press Freedom Award from the Committee to Protect Journalists. The award is given for journalists who show courage in defending press freedom in the face of attacks, threats or imprisonment.

== Personal life ==
Abdinur married a former journalist and human rights activist in 2004. They had their first child in 2005, and later had two more daughters. After several of his friends and co-workers were killed and his family was threatened, Abdinur moved his family away from Mogadishu. He himself, however, stayed in Mogadishu and continued working.

Agence France-Presse's Somalia correspondent Mustafa Haji Abdinur has been awarded the CNN Multichoice African Journalist of the Year Award in the Free Press category in the year 2010.

On June 17, 2013, Mustafa Haji Abdinur and four other International journalists were invited to address the Security council. It was the first debate on journalism at the Security Council since it passed a resolution on journalism, proposed by France and Greece, in 2006.
