= Abdul Samay Hamed =

Afghan journalist and cartoonist

- Occupations: Journalist; Cartoonist
- Awards: International Press Freedom

Abdul Samay Hamed (Dari: سمیع حامد) is an Afghan journalist and cartoonist. The Village Voice described him in 2003 as "one of Afghanistan's sharpest political satirists".

Hamed was trained as a physician, but he views his primary work as the promotion of freedom of expression. In 1985, he began his first underground newspaper, Salam, in Mazar-i-Sharif. He went on to found nine more, including the women's magazine Sadaf. In 2003, Hamed said that he had started more than 90% of Afghanistan's "free" publications. He has criticized the power of local warlords on the BBC's Dari service, to which he is a frequent contributor.

In 1997, he had a confrontation on the street with Mohammed Mohaqiq, then the Interior Minister of Afghanistan, for his outspokenness. Hamed alleges that Mohaqiq and eight bodyguards proceeded to assault him, the bodyguards striking him with rifle butts and bayonets. Alarmed by the lawlessness of Afghanistan and the rise of the Taliban, he fled the country the following year and received political asylum in Denmark.

He returned to Afghanistan in 2002 after the US invasion drove the Taliban from power. He then co-founded the press freedom organization "Association for the Defense of Afghan Writers' Rights", as well as a new magazine, Telaya, focused on social and political problems. When regional authorities attempted to ban Telaya in Baghlan Province, Hamed responded by appealing to the national Information Ministry, who overruled the regional authorities and allowed him to continue publishing. Hamed also began to contribute to the satirical newspaper, Kalak-e-Rhaastgoy—an "ironic parody of news events" that he compares to the US satirical paper The Onion—as well as drawing cartoons and writing satirical songs.

In April 2003, an unknown man approached Hamed on the street, called his name, and handed him a piece of paper; as Hamed was reading it, the man slashed him in the chest with a knife. Hamed was cut several more times, but eventually succeeded in disarming his attacker. However, the assailant began to call for a friend to help, at which point Hamed released him and fled to a hospital. His attacker was never caught. Since the attack, Hamed has rarely gone out in public unless accompanied by one of his six brothers.

In November 2003, he was awarded the International Press Freedom Award of the Committee to Protect Journalists, "an annual recognition of courageous journalism".
