= Niyaz Abdullah =

Iraqi journalist

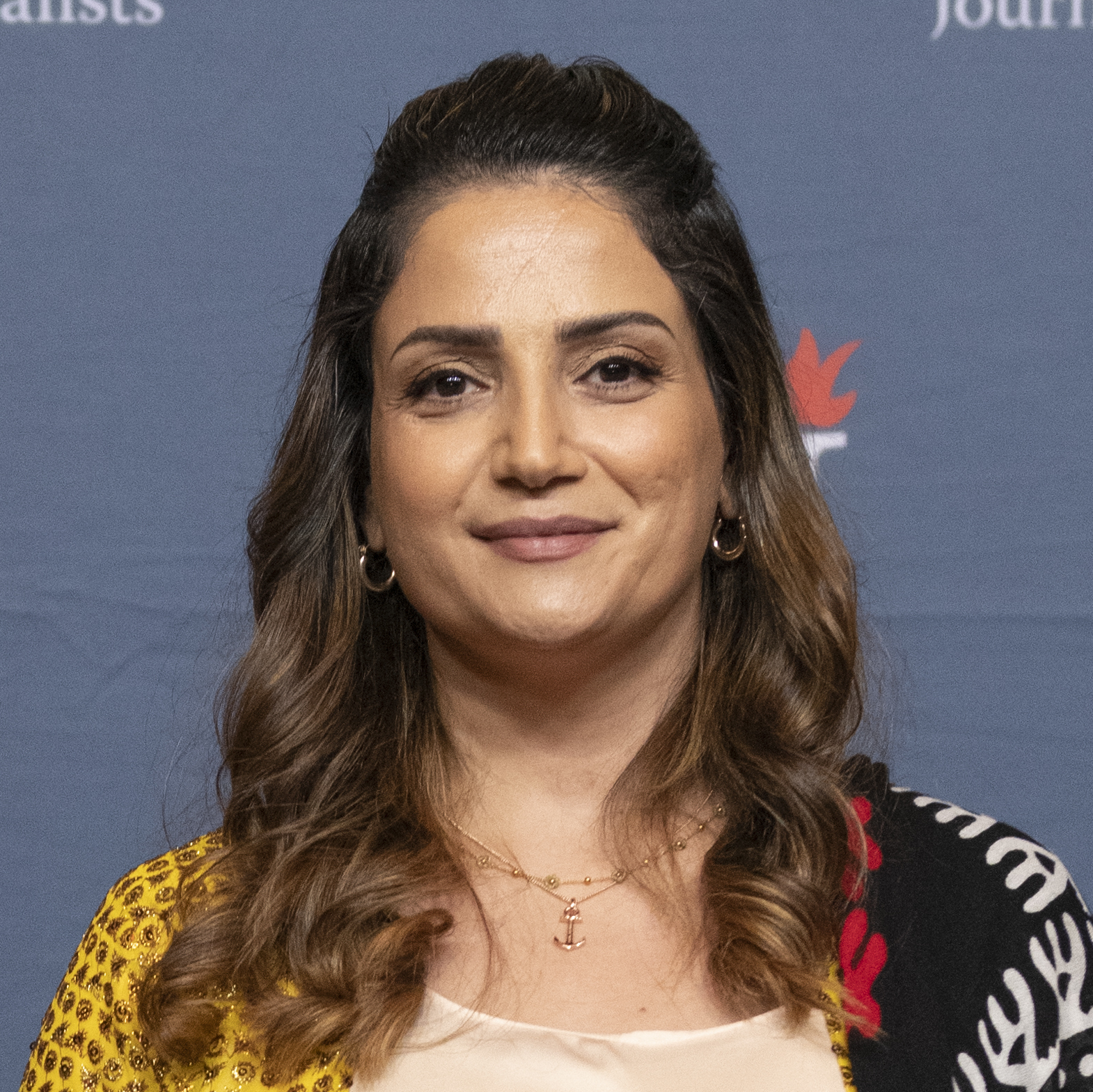
- Occupation: Journalist
- Awards: CPJ International Press Freedom Award (2022)

Niyaz Abdullah (Sorani Kurdish: نیاز عەبدوڵا) is a Kurdish Iraqi freelance journalist working in Iraqi Kurdistan. She contributes to Radio Nawa, the broadcaster NRT, and websites Westga, Zhyan News Network, Hawlati, and Skurd. She was awarded the CPJ International Press Freedom Award in 2022.
