= Sony Esteus =

Haitian radio journalist

- Occupation: Radio journalist
- Organization: Sosyete Animasyon Kominikayon Sosyal
- Known for: 1991 assault
- Awards: International Press Freedom Award (1991)

Sony Esteus was a Haitian radio journalist. For seventeen years, he served as executive director of Sosyete Animasyon Kominikayon Sosyal (Society for the Promotion of Social Communications, SAKS), an organization supporting Haitian community-based radio. At its height, SAKS supported around 30 community radio stations around the country, though many of these faced difficulties and suspended broadcasts following the 2010 earthquake. Esteus also serves as the Caribbean representative of the World Association of Community Radio Broadcasters.

During the 1991 Haitian coup d'état that deposed Jean-Bertrand Aristide, Esteus was working for radio Tropic FM. While covering a political rally on 12 April 1992, Esteus was arrested by three plainclothes policemen. He was taken by taxi to the headquarters of the Port-au-Prince police, where police officials accused his station of having pro-Aristide sympathies. He was held and interrogated for five hours, during which police scratched him, pistol-whipped him, and finally forced him to lie on his stomach while being beaten with a stick. His right hand, left arm, and two fingers on his left hand were broken in the attacks. In the final interrogation, the officers demanded that he confess to distributing pro-Aristide leaflets. When Esteus refused, he was released by a police captain who claimed to have just discovered that Esteus was a reporter. Tropic FM suspended its broadcasts in light of the attack and ongoing threats, while Esteus spent the next three months in bed with his arms in slings.

Later in the year, Esteus was awarded an International Press Freedom Award from the Committee to Protect Journalists for courage in reporting. Esteus went on to work for Radio Haiti Inter for nearly a decade before the station's 2003 closing.

Sony died March 2, 2015, from unknown causes.
