= Byron Barrera =

Guatemalan journalist and human rights activist

Byron Barrera Ortiz
- Occupation: Journalist
- Known for: Reporting on human rights abuses, attempted assassination
- Spouse: Refugio Araceli Villanueva de Barrera (died 26 October 1990)

Byron Barrera Ortiz is a Guatemalan journalist noted for his reporting of human rights abuses by the Guatemalan government during and after the Guatemalan Civil War, for which he received repeated threats against his life. In 1990, his wife, Refugio Araceli Villanueva de Barrera, was murdered in an attack on their car. Members of the Guatemalan military have been implicated in the crime.

== Early career ==
Guatemalan by birth, Barrera was forced to flee the country after reporting in 1980 that the Guatemalan military was massacring Indian peasants in Quiché Department. He spent the years from 1980 to 1986 in exile, returning to Guatemala following the victory of Vinicio Cerezo's Guatemalan Christian Democracy party. He then became as director of the Agencia Centroamericana de Noticias (Central American News Agency), and vice-president of the Guatemalan Journalists Association. He also served as the founder and editor of a weekly news magazine, La Epoca, which one of its reporters described as being devoted to "muckraking pieces on corruption in government and private enterprise, no-holds-barred political analysis, and social investigation on topics like poverty and the environment". The magazine only lasted for five months from its inception in January 1988 until its buildings were firebombed. The firebombing was believed to be carried out by members of state security forces, and Barrera subsequently left the country for several months after threats against himself and his family.

== 1990 assassination attempt ==
On 25 October 1990, Barrera became aware that he was being shadowed by two men on a motorcycle. He reportedly informed President Cerezo's head of security of the tail, and gave officials the license plate number of the motorcycle.

The following day, Barrera was driving with his wife, Refugio Araceli Villanueva de Barrera, and an unidentified friend when they stopped at a traffic light at the corner of the 35th street and the Calzada Aguilar Batres in Zone 11 of Guatemala City. A motorcycle pulled alongside Barrera's car and the riders opened fire with an automatic weapon or weapons. Refugio Villanueva de Barrera was killed instantly, while Byron Barrera and their friend were injured and hospitalized. Barrera later attributed his survival to a bulletproof vest he had recently begun to wear. After recovering from his injuries, Barrera took his two children into exile in Costa Rica. "I have had to explain the truth to my children", he stated in a November open letter. "The people of their country who are conspicuous for their ideas of freedom are assassinated."

== Investigation ==
In August 1991, Barrera returned to Guatemala to present evidence in the case. While there, he gave a press conference accusing Guatemala's armed forces of involvement in the killings. Journalists who reported on his accusation reportedly received anonymous threats. The investigating prosecutors and Barrera's lawyers were likewise threatened, causing the latter to withdraw from the case. Amnesty International subsequently issued an appeal to the Guatemalan government, expressing concern that the murderers appeared to be members of state security forces and urging that both they and those responsible for the subsequent threats be brought to justice. A document released by the US Central Intelligence Agency in 1995 also implicated the Guatemalan military in the attacks.

== Later career ==
In 1991, the year after the attack, Barrera won the International Press Freedom Award of the Committee to Protect Journalists.

Barrera was threatened again for his journalism in 1993, when his name was circulated in an anonymous leaflet threatening him and 23 other journalists with death; Amnesty International again issued an alert on his behalf. Barrera's brother Adolfo is also a journalist and was abducted in 1994; he managed to escape and subsequently fled the country.

Barrera was allegedly assaulted in Guatemala City in 2008 by members of the Secretariat for Administrative and Security Matters (Secretaría de Asuntos Administrativos y de Seguridad) following an attempt to photograph a new vehicle of Vice President Rafael Espada, prompting IFEX to issue a protest on his behalf.
