= Quimy de León =

Guatemalan journalist

- Occupation: Journalist
- Awards: CPJ International Press Freedom Award (2024)

Quimy de León is a Guatemalan journalist. She was awarded the CPJ International Press Freedom Award in 2024. She has worked with outlets such as Forbidden Stories. She founded Prensa Comunitaria and in 2017 Ruda, a feminist digital magazine.
