= María Teresa Montaño =

Mexican journalist

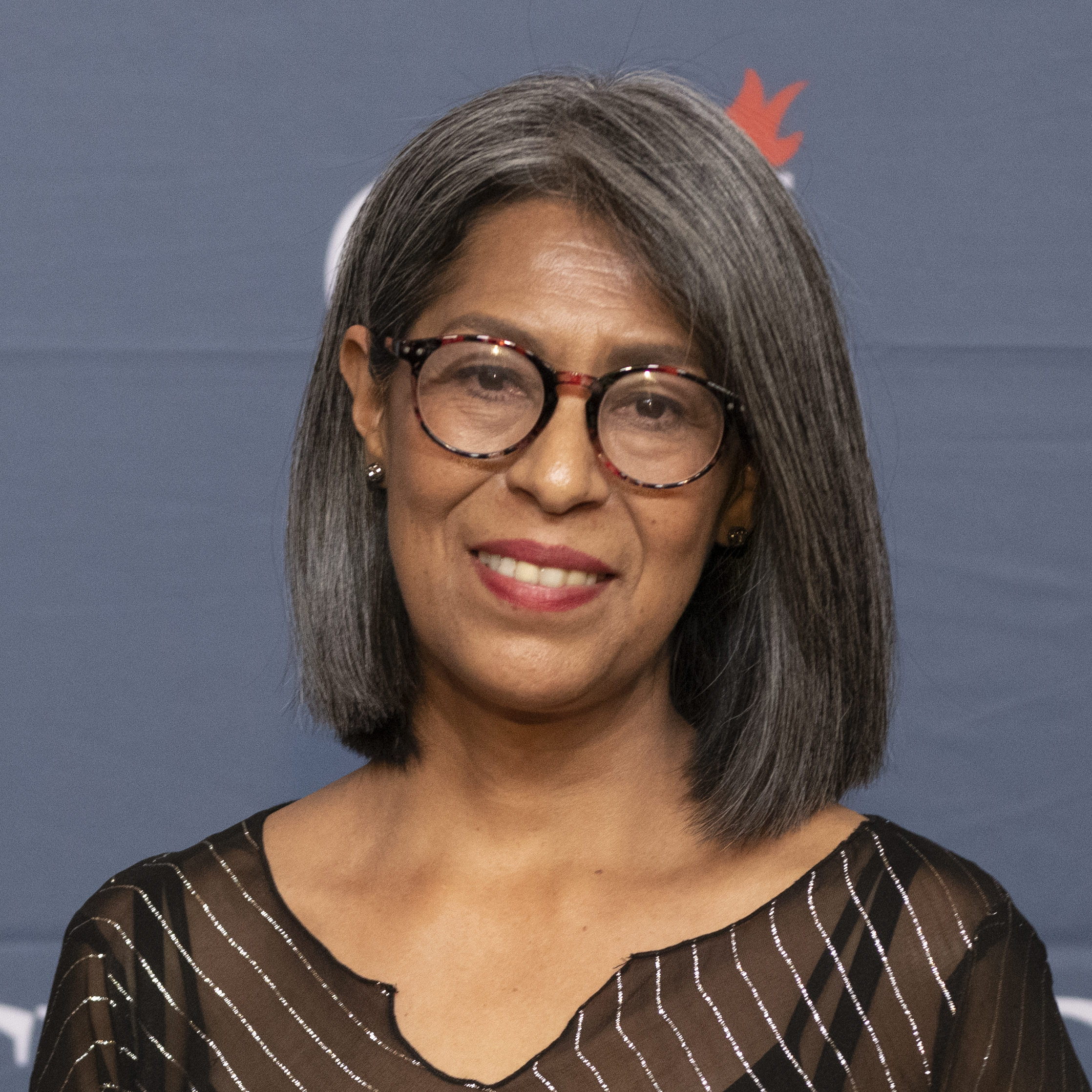
- Occupation: Journalist
- Awards: CPJ International Press Freedom Award (2023)

María Teresa Montaño Delgado is a Mexican journalist. She is the editor and founder of The Observer which is an investigative and fact checking website. She was earlier a freelance journalist. She was awarded the CPJ International Press Freedom Award in 2023.

In 2021, Montaño was briefly kidnapped by unknown assailants in Toluca following which she was enrolled into the protection programme of the Federal Mechanism for the Protection of Journalists and Human Rights Defenders.
