= Navidi Vakhsh =

Navidi Vakhsh (Tajik: Навиди Вахш) was a pro-Islamic, Tajik-language thrice-weekly newspaper of Tajikistan. The paper was published in Khatlon Province, 160 kilometres (100 mi) south of Dushanbe.

A number of its reporters were murdered during the country's 1992-1997 civil war, leading The Committee to Protect Journalists to award it the International Press Freedom Award, "an annual recognition of courageous journalism". A CPJ report later found "official complicity" in the murder of at least four Navidi Vakhsh staffers.
