= Sai Zaw Thaike =

Burmese photojournalist

- စိုင်းဇော်သိုက်
- Born: Myanmar
- Occupation: Photojournalist
- Employer: Myanmar Now (2017–present)
- Known for: Reporting on Cyclone Mocha aftermath, independent journalism in Myanmar
- Awards: RSF Courage Prize (2026)

Sai Zaw Thaike (စိုင်းဇော်သိုက်) is a Burmese independent photojournalist associated with the independent news agency Myanmar Now.

In September 2023, he was sentenced to 20 years in prison with hard labor by a military tribunal, marking the longest prison sentence handed down to a journalist since the 2021 Myanmar coup d'état. On 1 June 2026, he was awarded the prestigious Courage Prize by Reporters Without Borders (RSF) for his brave reporting under military suppression.

== Early career ==
Sai Zaw Thaike is a journalist who began working as a photojournalist for Myanmar Now in 2017, leading field coverage for investigative reports. Prior to his tenure at Myanmar Now, he worked for various local media outlets, including SkyNet, The Messenger Journal, The Irrawaddy, and 7Day News.

Following the 2021 military coup, he chose to remain in Myanmar to continue his journalistic work and care for his elderly parents despite opportunities to flee abroad.

== Arrest and sentencing ==
In May 2023, following the devastation of Cyclone Mocha in Rakhine State, Sai Zaw Thaike traveled undercover to Sittwe to document the humanitarian aftermath. On 23 May 2023, he was arrested by military authorities alongside four other individuals. He was subsequently interrogated for over a week in military interrogation centers located in Sittwe and Yangon.

The military authorities filed multiple charges against him under four laws -Section 27 of the Natural Disaster Management Law, Section 505(a) of the Penal Code (incitement), Section 66(d) of the Telecommunications Law and Section 124 of the Penal Code (sedition).

On 6 September 2023, during his first closed-door military tribunal hearing at Insein Prison, he was sentenced to 20 years in prison with hard labor without legal representation or the opportunity to defend himself. He remains detained in Insein Prison, where prison sources report that he faces strict confinement alongside other political prisoners.

== Torture and abuse in prison ==
In February 2025, reports emerged from Committee to Protect Journalists (CPJ) and Myanmar Now indicating that Sai Zaw Thaike had been subjected to "daily physical abuse" and "retaliatory torture" since January 2025 inside Insein Prison.prisoners. The targeted mistreatment was believed to be a direct retaliation after he and two other political prisoners informed visiting representatives of the Myanmar National Human Rights Commission about the staff's human rights violations against inmates. Furthermore, authorities reportedly punished him for allegedly leaking prison intelligence to external media outlets. He has also endured periods of solitary confinement.

== International recognition ==
On 1 June 2026, during the 34th RSF Press Freedom Awards held at the Palais du Pharo in Marseille, France, He was awarded the RSF "Courage Prize". The award, integrated within the 77th World News Media Congress, recognized his bravery in documenting ground realities in Myanmar at extreme personal risk. International press freedom organizations, including the Committee to Protect Journalists (CPJ), have repeatedly called for his immediate and unconditional release.
