= Janet Hinostroza =

Ecuadorian journalist

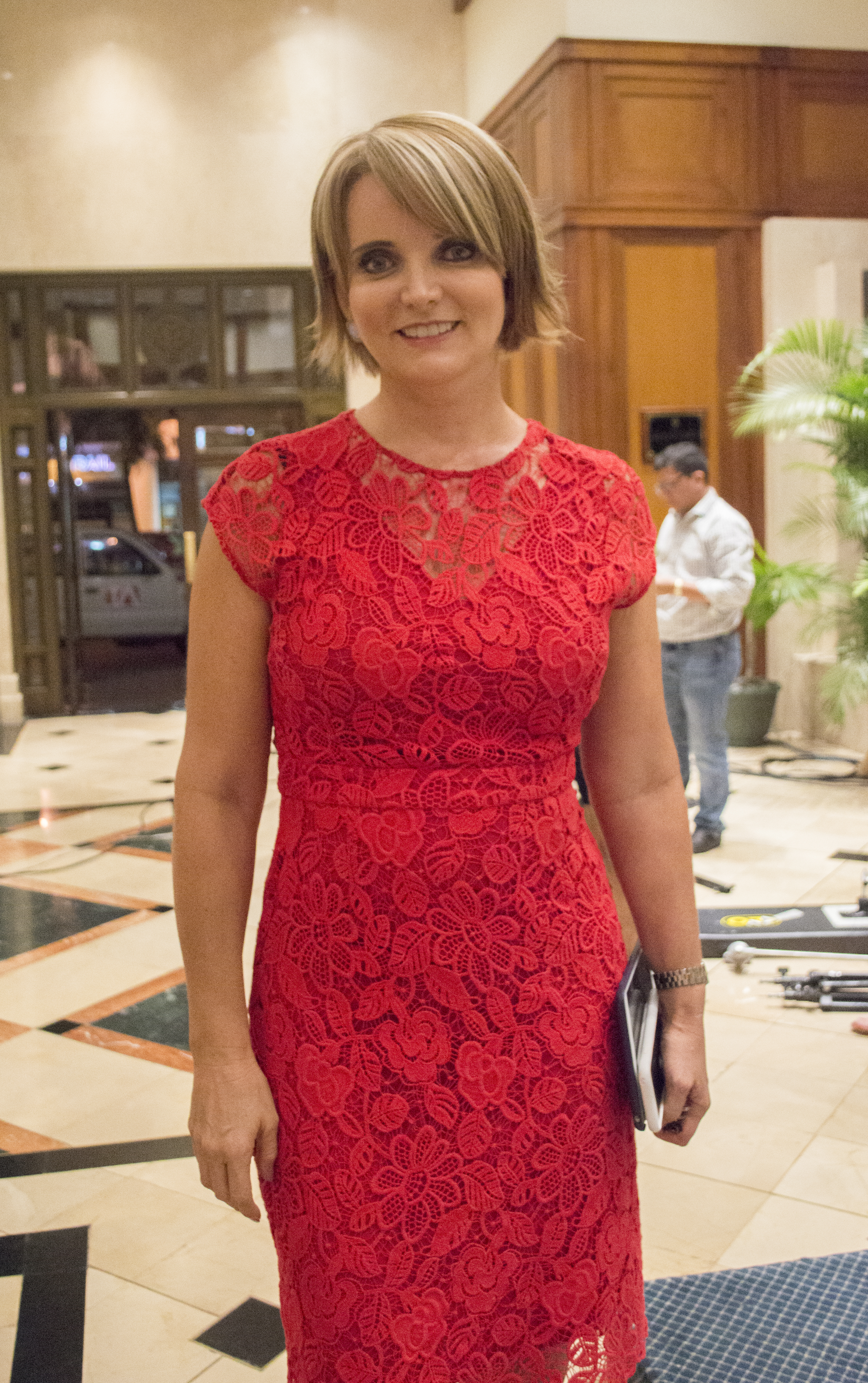
- Born: Janet Hinostroza; Quito, Ecuador
- Education: Central University of Ecuador
- Occupations: Television journalist, investigative journalist, politician

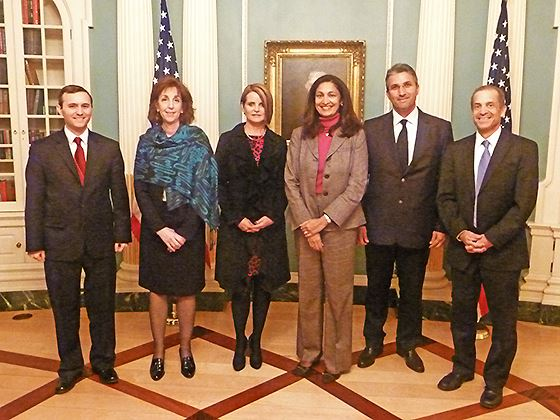
Janet Hinostroza, third from the left, meeting with US State Department officials.

Janet Hinostroza is a television journalist from Ecuador. Her work focuses on the exposure of government corruption. She is the anchor on a morning news program, La Mañana de 24 Horas, and was the creator and anchor of the long-running investigative news program 30 Plus, which aired on Teleamazonas for more than a decade, investigating such subjects as human trafficking, arms trafficking, government and police corruption, and extrajudicial killings.

Hinostroza has been a major target and opponent of the Ecuadorian government, and has also been a recurring topic of President Rafael Correa's weekly TV and radio talks, which usually last several hours. Correa has referred to her dismissively as "blondie." In 2012, after Hinostroza reported on a suspicious loan by the state bank Cofiec to a businessman allegedly associated with a cousin of Correa, she received death threats and took a leave of absence for safety reasons. Due to this she was offered security surveillance by the Minister of the Interior José Serrano to which Hinostroza gratefully did not accept.

In 2013, she was awarded the International Press Freedom Award of the New York–based Committee to Protect Journalists.

== Early life and education ==
Hinostroza is from Quito, the next to youngest of seven children of Quiteño and Ibarreña Hinostroza. "I always wanted to be a journalist since I can remember," she has said. "I was always a very shy girl, so when I announced my desire to be a journalist, my family, and especially my father, were very surprised." She studied at the International University of Ecuador while working as a reporter and presenter for Teleamazonas.

== Career ==
After her graduation, Hinostroza found work as a national news reporter on TC TV, a cable TV channel in Ecuador. She spent eight years as a reporter in Colombia, where her encounter with investigative journalism led her to feel that her own country “needed more investigative journalism.” After her return to Ecuador, she created a program dedicated to investigative journalism, “30 Plus,” which aired on the private Teleamazonas channel. She was the anchor of “30 Plus” from 2004 to 2014. It was the only program of its type in Ecuador. Hinostroza stated that “30 Plus” had no competition, but added that she wished it did, because the Ecuadorian people needed more of this kind of television fare.

Hinostroza is also the longtime host of the morning news program “La Mañana de 24 Horas,” which is broadcast daily on Teleamazonas.

In addition, shea radio program on 98.1 FM Mundo, is the local correspondent for the international TV network Univision, and writes a column for the newspaper Hoy. She manages a production company that produces journalistic programming and audiovisual products. She has stated that she prefers behind-the-scenes investigative journalism to interviewing on camera.

Hinostroza reported in 2011 on a woman who had been charged with showing disrespect to Correa and his government. After the report was broadcast, the government ordered Teleamazonas to devote 10 minutes of Hinostroza's program time to a rebuttal by an official government spokesman. Hinostroza has been frequently targeted with such pre-emptions.

When Correa offered asylum to WikiLeaks founder Julian Assange in September 2012, Hinostroza called it "a good move politically for Ecuador—because Assange represents not only freedom of expression, but someone who stands up to America and Correa is using him to hurt the US. … it's not about press freedom."

=== Bank scandal and leave of absence ===
After presenting a report on an apparent case of government corruption on La Mañana de 24 Horas in 2012, Hinostroza received a number of anonymous, threatening phone calls. After receiving a call from an unidentified stranger who detailed her young son's daily movements and threatened to kidnap him, Hinostroza decided to take a leave of absence from the news program, which was temporarily taken off the air. She explained that she had spent years enduring insults, but that her family should not have to endure them. The threat to her son, she stated, was “the drop that spilled the cup” (i.e., the straw that broke the camel's back).

The case in question involved a loan by the state-owned Cofiec Bank, then headed by Pedro Delgado Campaña, an Argentinian second cousin of Correa, to a businessman, Gastón Duzac, who later defaulted on the loan. Hinostroza's reporting uncovered irregularities in the loan and linked Delgado to Duzac. After her report was broadcast, the government compelled her to devote ten minutes of her program to a speech in which a government representative accused her of disrespecting the president.

Hinostroza has said that Ecuador's then interior minister, José Serrano, after hearing about the threats that forced her off the air, immediately offered her protection, but she turned down the offer because "I do not think that an honest journalist should have to do his or her job with bodyguards." Correa himself maintained that the government was "seriously investigating" the threats against Hinostroza and "expressed solidarity" with her, but he added that he still considered her "a politician disguised as a journalist." Hinostroza said that despite the threats, "we won't give up, this is an opportunity to invent new ways to do journalism and in Ecuador we are figuring out how to do it." She added that the only thing that could weaken Correa's power to silence the media would be if "the money runs out, and I don't know if we are near it."

During Hinostroza's absence from La Mañana de 24 Horas, she continued to appear on 30 Plus and on special news reports.

=== State Department briefing ===
In November 2013, the U.S. State Department hosted Hinostroza, who briefed officials on "press freedom challenges." The officials "expressed concerns about the plight of journalists worldwide and reaffirmed the United States' commitment to freedom of expression." Acting Assistant Secretary of State Uzra Zeya praised Hinostroza and other awardees for their "courage" and "commitment to speaking truth to power."

=== End of 30 Plus run ===
30 Plus ended its nearly 11-year run on January 11, 2014. Hinostroza explained that investigative journalism "has never been profitable" and that in recent years, the budget of 30 Plus had fallen every year, eventually making it impossible to continue production. Another factor was that "now the doors of public institutions are hundred percent closed" to Teleamazonas, a situation she characterized as "outrageous, unacceptable, and unbelievable" in a country claiming to be a democracy with "full freedom of expression."

"not interested in having a free press" and "has made confrontation of the press a state policy." It has, according to her, "employed different tactics to silence the press, including regulations and legislation. …. It's a government that wants to do many good things for people but is violating the law. So that's why they need a silent press."[19]

Hinostroza has complained about the Ecuadorian government's introduction of the legal concept of "media lynching," meaning "a concerted effort of media and journalists to damage the reputation of a public institution or an individual." She has explained this concept as follows: "if I break some story about corruption of a public official or a public entity, and that investigation is followed" by reports on the same matter by another news outlet, Ecuadorian law considers this "a concerted effort to disseminate information that damages the reputation of an individual or entity" and, thus, a punishable offense.

Correa, according to Hinostroza, "has viewed the press as the enemy from the moment he took office. He considers us his only enemy because there is no political opposition" and "says we conspire against him, but all we've done is expose corruption in his government or been critical."

In December 2015 the Toronto Star reported that Hinostroza had made her cell phone available to computer security experts at Citizen Lab, at the University of Toronto, who found it had been hacked with software designed to spy on her. In particular, they asserted that the brazenness of the software strongly suggested that the perpetrators were government security officials.

== Other professional activities ==
Hinostroza spoke at the Oslo Freedom Forum in May 2014.

== Honors and awards ==
She has received 3 international awards and 11 national awards for her journalism.

In 2013, she won the International Press Freedom Award of the Committee to Protect Journalists (CPJ). When she traveled to New York City to accept the award, pro-Correa protesters picketed outside the Waldorf-Astoria Hotel "chanting and carrying signs branding Hinostroza a traitor and a liar." In Ecuador, "virulent attacks on social media spiked against her." Some of the Ecuadorian protesters outside the Waldorf-Astoria described Hinostroza as "a shill for the U.S. government" whose "activities were undermining their country."

Upon accepting the CPJ award, Hinostroza described 30 Plus as "the only investigative show currently on the air in Ecuador," adding that "I cannot air very controversial issues as I did in the past," partly because “the government has banned officials from talking to the press, and it's not allowing access to information." She also stated that Ecuador was "going through a difficult time," when powerful people had "taken over the word and … turned the right to express oneself freely into a public service, bound and controlled by political power."

In a video made in connection with the CPJ award, Hinostroza noted that there were no longer any investigative units in any Ecuadorian media companies, owing largely to government pressure.

After Hinostroza was presented with the CPJ award, Sen. Patrick Leahy paid tribute to her on the floor of the U.S. Senate during the 2013–14 session, describing her as "a courageous Ecuadorian journalist." Healy said she had "attracted the wrath of the Ecuadorian authorities" and cited this as an "example of a steady deterioration of democratic principles in Ecuador.

== Personal life ==
Hinostroza's husband is Juan Fernando Cevallos. They have two children, Paula and Joaquin.
