= Danish Karokhel =

Afghanistani journalist

Danish Karokhel is the director of Pajhwok Afghan News, which is one of the leading independent news agencies in Afghanistan. In 2008, he won an International Press Freedom Award from the Committee to Protect Journalists. The award is given to journalists who show courage in defending press freedom in the face of attacks, threats or imprisonment.
