= Human rights in Paraguay =

When Paraguay adopted its 1992 Constitution, it created a new foundation as a democratic republic. The constitution includes a wide range of human rights protections, including rights to life, liberty, equality, due process, freedom of expression, and rights for women and Indigenous communities. In addition to the constitution, Paraguay has passed other laws aiming to protect human rights. However, notably, same sex marriage and abortion is illegal in Paraguay.

While Paraguay generally does have a large legal framework that protects human rights, these protections are not always respected in everyday life. Women experience gender-based violence, workplace discrimination, and limited access to reproductive health and justice. Indigenous communities continue to lose land, face discrimination, and face weak enforcement of their collective rights. Furthermore, police corruption, excessive force, arbitrary arrest, and unsafe prisons undermine Paraguay's guarantees of liberty and due process. Same sex relations are not criminalized, but LGBTQ individuals still face widespread discrimination. Workers legally have the right to unionize, but many still endure exploitative labor practice, like child labor and unsafe conditions. Additionally, the government fails to meaningfully include and provide support for persons with disabilities.

Freedom House reports that corruption can be found among some elected officials, police, and judges. These problems may weaken the government’s ability to effectively implement and enforce laws. This could contribute to the gap between what the law promises and what people actually experience.

== Ombudsman ==
The Paraguayan Constitution established the Ombudsman’s Office, an institution that has held a key role in the country’s democratic transition following the end of the Alfredo Stroessner dictatorship in 1992. The office was designed to receive human rights complaints and strengthen public trust by promoting government accountability. Despite its mandate, the institution faces significant structural limitations due to chronic underfunding and insufficient staffing.

In 2011, the UN Committee Against Torture called on Paraguay to appoint a new ombudsman after the previous official’s term had expired. The committee expressed concern over the institution’s limited resources and urged the state to provide the financial, material and personnel support necessary for the office to function effectively, independently, and without political interference.

== Constitutional Human Rights Amendments ==
On June 20, 1992, the Constituent Assembly adopted a new Paraguayan constitution, marking a decisive effort to establish checks and balances and ensure a formal separation of powers across the branches of government. Paraguay’s political system is organized into three main branches: the legislative, judicial, and the executive. The 1992 Constitution replaced the 1967, which lacked sufficient institutional separation between these branches, allowing political power to remain highly concentrated. By introducing structural limits on executive authority and strengthening institutional oversight, the 1992 Constitution aimed to support a more balanced and democratic system of governance.

The Constitution also expanded the legal framework for human rights protections. It affirmed fundamental rights including the right to life, freedom of expression, access to health care, education, and the principle of equality for all citizens. These provisions reflected a broader shift toward democratic freeform and alignment with international human rights norms.

Key human rights amendments and constitutional provisions in Paraguay include:

Article 6: Quality of Life

Chapter II of liberty (articles 9-23)

Article 12: of Detention and of Arrest

Article 16: Of the Defense during Trial

Article 17: of Procedural Rights

Article 19: Of the Preventive Imprisonment

Article 46. Of the Equality of Persons states, “all the inhabitants of the republic are equal in dignity and rights.

Article 47. Of the Equality of Rights of Men and Women, that men and women have equal civil, political, social, economic and cultural rights. The state creates mechanisms and conditions by which equality between genders is effective.

Article 52: Union in Matrimony of a man and a woman is one of the fundamental components in the formation of a family

One of the most influential amendments includes the entirety of the constitutions Chapter V. (Article 62-67) is entirely devoted to Indigenous Peoples, an improvement that was lacking beforehand. The Paraguayan Constitution defined Indigenous people as groups of culture formed before the organization of the Paraguayan State, granting equal rights to everyone under this definition. Secondly, Article 63 grants Indigenous people the protection of their past, present, and future ethnic identities. As long as their systems of organizations involved with politics, religion,

Article 77. Teaching in the Native (Materna) Language, which protects the right to teach in the official native language of students and teachers. Indigenous educational rights are necessary to upholding Indigenous rights generally.

Section I. regards all aspects of labor rights. Article 86 through article 100 protects the right to work, the right of nondiscrimination, the work of women, the work of minors, of working and resting days, of the Syndical Freedom, and of the Right to Strike and to Lock-out. Each of these protections ensure equality in the workplace, regardless of gender, and importantly protects the right to unions and strikes.

== Women's Rights ==
The Paraguayan constitution generally protects women’s rights. Under the 1992 constitution, women and men have “equal civil, political, social, economic, and cultural rights.” However, the lived experiences of women don’t always align with the constitution.

Through law, gender discrimination in the workplace is prohibited. However, in reality, this is not always enforced. The government often fails to investigate the unequal pay, harassment, and hiring discrimination that women face. Labor laws guarantee maternity leave, but many employers still hesitate to hire women because of it. High rates of teenage pregnancy and limited reproductive resources further limit women’s access to the workforce. This effect is even more exaggerated in rural and indigenous women.

Paraguay criminalizes rape and domestic violence with a prison sentence up to 10 years. However, because of lack of law enforcement action and underreporting due to stigma and fear of retaliation, and also police are often hesitant to make arrests, incidence of rape and domestic violence are severely underreported and the perpetrators are not held accountable. Despite underreporting, between January and August 2023, the police received 11,000 reports of domestic violence. Many of the reported attackers went unpunished.

Sexual violence is a crisis in Paraguay, and especially concerning for more vulnerable groups of women including indigenous women and teenagers. In 2019, 12 cases of sexual violence against children and teenagers were reported every day, with many of the abuses occurring within families. Girls are also at high risk for sexual violence as many are recruited in the “criadazgo” for domestic labour. The criadazgo is a well established practice in the informal economy where at least 45,000 (in 2020) low-income children work as servants for wealthy families, in exchange for rights like shelter, food, and education.

Furthermore, feminicide, which is the intentional gender related murder of women, is criminalized with 10–30 years of prison under the Paraguayan law no. 5777.16. However, police often fail to enforce restraining orders, punish offenders, or protect survivors.

Paraguay's abortion laws deem termination of a pregnancy a crime punishable by prison, with the only exception being to save the women from dying. This law has led to both women and girls as young as ten years old to carry out unwanted pregnancies, even ones that resulted from sexual assault. While certainly an issue of women's rights, the effects are also a children's rights violation. In 2019, at least 1000 14 year old girls and 12,000 girls aged 15–19 gave birth. Many of these were the results of sexual violence and lack of access to education and reproductive health services.

The Paraguayan legal framework that protects women doesn't always get translated into effective policy or education initiatives. For instance, Law 6202, adopted in 2018, establishes the prevention of sexual abuse and comprehensive care of survivors; however, the proper measures haven’t been taken to fulfill this. Reproductive health services are not widespread or consistent and are often nonexistent in rural areas. Sexual education is limited and doctors sometimes deny health services based on their own personal beliefs.

Additionally, the Minister of Education and Science issued a resolution banning “gender ideology” and removed support pathways for students discriminated against over their sexual and reproductive rights. Furthermore, Circular no. 005/2022 of the Ministry of Foreign Affairs states that certain words, including “gender, diversity, and autonomy” must be avoided.

However, there is evidence of positive change and efforts to improve the lived experiences of women in Paraguay. For instance, the Ciudad Mujer initiative provides women with services related to prevention of violence, economic empowerment, and sexual health. There is also a campaign called “Courtship without violence,” that is aimed at educating youth about health relationships and sexist stereotypes. The Ministry for Women’s Affairs has also increased its influence, and there are women serving in most levels of the government due to the Paraguayan law that requires that at least 20% of candidates in each party must be women.

== Indigenous People's Rights ==
Establishing a clear overview of constitutionally recognized rights helps ground broader assessments of Indigenous human rights conditions in the country. Paraguay is home to 19 legally recognized Indigenous Peoples, who collectively speak five distinct linguistic families. The 1992 Constitution formally recognizes these Indigenous groups as distinct cultural communities and affirms a broad set of collective rights. According to the International Work Group for Indigenous Affairs, the Constitution "guarantees and recognizes a wide range of rights in favour of Indigenous People.”

Despite constitutional recognition, Indigenous communities have historically faced criminalization, violent repression, and sustained efforts to undermine communal land ownership. These actions have frequently been linked to land disputes and policies that have enabled the dispossession of collective territories. Human rights reporting indicates that these pressures have also limited coordinated political action among impacted groups, weakening broader claims to territorial and civil rights.

Paraguay has been repeatedly held accountable in international courts for violations of Indigenous territorial rights. In 2010, the Inter-American Court of Human Rights ruled against Paraguay for the third time for failing to uphold Indigenous land rights, affirming a troubling pattern of non-compliance. Amnesty International documented rights violations including threats to life and physical integrity, failures to protect communal property, denial of judicial safeguards, inadequate legal protection, violations affecting children, and failures to uphold protections for minors. Earlier court rulings in 2005 and 2006 found in favor of the Yakye Axa and Sawhoyomaxa communities, yet both cases revealed substantial gaps between legal decisions and state enforcement, with minimal government action taken to restore land or guarantee long-term protections, By 2010, assessments suggested that Indigenous human rights protections in Paraguay, even when legally affirmed, were rarely meaningfully implemented. The lack of institutionalized land rights has led to the continued lack of enforcement of protections to Indigenous communities and their land. In 2005 and 2006, the Court ruled in favor of Yakye Axa and Sawhoyamaxa communities, although little has been done to follow through with either case. By 2010, Paraguayan Indigenous human rights were not promising, and when protections were put in place, little was done to fully enforce them.

More recently, in 2021, the enforcement of Indigenous people’s rights still lacks proper protection. In this year, Indigenous and non-Indigenous people alike took to the streets mobilizing for the repeal of law converting the act of trespass as an offense. Criminalizing this action puts pressure on those who occupy land and use protest as their way to gain more rights. There were four issues raised by the Indigenous representatives: legal regularization of peasant and Indigenous settlements, protection of peasants and Indigenous people from forced evictions, recovery of ill-gotten lands, care for those individuals and families evicted, especially those camped in the capital city and in other places around the country.

== LGBT+ rights ==
Paraguay grants the LGBTQ+ community minor rights, but the government does not actively protect members against discrimination or grant major rights under current Paraguay legislation.

Same-sex relations have been legalized through Article 325 of the Paraguayan Penal Code in 1990. The government does not recognize same-sex marriage under the civil code of 1991, with the term “marriage” exclusively to describe heterosexual relationships. Same-sex couples can't legally adopt children as of 2025.

For legal documentation, citizens can only legally identify with the gender that aligns with their sex at birth. Intersex individuals must identify as either male or female when registering their sex. Intersex minors are not granted protection against intersex surgery, which is practiced legally throughout the country. Citizens are granted access to gender affirming treatment with limited resources to safely transition. Mental health professionals are not allowed to diagnose individuals solely on their sexual orientation and identity under the Article 3 of Law No.7,018. on mental health as of November 2022 . As a result mental health professionals have been prevented from sending individuals to conversion therapy.

Officially, discrimination against homosexuals is illegal, though discrimination is widespread and government officials often ignore the law in practice. LGBTQ+ community is not granted any protection in discrimination in the military, housing selection, or employment.

LGBTQ+ groups operate freely, and the government issues permits and provides security for gay-pride marches. Although security is provided these marches and gatherings have led to clashes between the police and the paraders as of recently. Parades have accused the government of discrimination after some homophobic statements made by Colorado and UNACE congressmen.

== Labor Rights ==
Under legislation established by the Minister of Labor, workers are granted the right to unionize, perform strikes, and collectively bargain under specific criteria. Additional legislation serves to protect union and strike coordinators against binding arbitration or retribution. The government does not actively enforce these rules nor penalize employers who have violated any protection law.

As of 2025, established law has set up a standard maximum of 8 work hours per day, 48 hours per week, and a required overtime payment for all workers exceeding these hours. The government has not established a national minimum wage for all working sectors. Some regions of the country have established their own minimum wage for workers.

Labor by children under 14 is illegal, but it is actually widespread. As of 2010, slightly over half of Paraguayan children between ages five and 17 are employed, with the majority working over 14 hours a week. There are known to be slaves in Paraguay, especially among domestic servants; parents sell children to perform forced labor, smuggle drugs, and commit other crimes. Enforcement of laws against these activities is hampered by a lack of resources.

As the department enforcing and passing new labor legislation, the Minister of Labor is responsible for reviewing and enforcing all the regulations established in a work environment. Even with the implementation of the occupational safety and health (OSH) regulations, workers are exposed to various harmful working environments as OSH officials don’t actively enforce any regulations.

== Rights to Liberty and Security of a Person ==
Under the Paraguayan Constitution, arbitrary killings, torture, and cruel treatments are prohibited. Laws further ensure due process, bar arbitrary arrest, and establish the judiciary as an independent branch. Notably, in the 1992 constitution, Paraguay adopted a new Criminal Code and Criminal Procedure Code, which discussed new criteria for mitigating punishment and incorporating alternative sanctions to imprisonment. According to the US State Department, this legal framework broadly aligns with international norms.

The arresting process, criminal justice system, and the policing diverges from the broad legal framework. Paraguayan police have been described in a 2010 U.S. State Department report as “poorly trained, inadequately funded, generally corrupt, and shielded by impunity.” Policemen commit kidnappings, detain civilians in order to extort bribes, and conspire with prosecutors to commit blackmail and other crimes. Police use excessive force and in 2023, there were 134 documented cases of police torture allegations. These allegations rarely lead to convictions and investigations are under-resourced and slow.

False convictions also occur. For instance, a group of international human-rights organizations issued a statement in December 2012 denouncing that 10 farmers had been on a hunger strike for two months. They were protesting the group of 54 people who were arbitrarily charged with seven criminal charges including offense of murder, attempted murder, serious injury, criminal association, grave coercion, coercion and invasion. The statement listed a series of violations of Paraguayan law that had been made in connection with this case.

Human rights violations are also prominent in prison facilities. As of January 2025, Paraguayan prison system is declared in a state of emergency. This was first announced in 2023, when Paraguay’s largest prison gang, Rotela Clan, took control of Paraguay's largest prison, Tacumbu.

Prison systems are overcrowded, with 19,000 current prisoners in facilities that are only designed for 10,000. Much of the overcrowding stems from pretrial detention abuse. Two thirds of the inmates are detainees who have not been sentenced yet. Furthermore, in 2010, 30% of inmates in Paraguayan prisons should have, according to the country's constitution, been released already, but were still being held pending a judge's order. Overcrowding ultimately leads to issues with facilities control of inmates, while also creating an environment where violence, inadequate medical care, high gang activity, escalating rates of tuberculosis, and food safety issues exist.

== Rights of Persons with Disabilities ==
Article 6 and Article 88 of the constitution broadly protects the rights of persons with disabilities through promoting quality of life and “special protection” in the workplace. More recent bills–from 2013-2020–have been passed that further protect the rights of persons with disabilities through more access to education and work and by officially recognizing Paraguayan Sign Language.

Despite these legal additions, disabled people face barriers to work and education. Only 1% of civil service positions are filled by persons with disabilities–a failure to reach the legally mandated 5%. Obstacles of accessing education and getting to school affect children, and only 17% of children with disabilities completed elementary school. Schools are not legally required to be wheelchair accessible. There is a link between disabilities and poverty in Paraguay. 40% of households with disabilities are in poverty, while 29% of able-bodied households are in poverty.

== Migrants rights ==
The Committee on the Protection of the Rights of All Migrant Workers and Members of Their Families recommended in 2012 that Paraguay “strengthen its institutional structure for dealing with migration-related issues” and “establish a coordination mechanism with a view to improving services for migrant workers and their families while, at the same time, working to ensure its compliance with and the uniformity of regional and international treaties to which Paraguay is party.” The committee also urged Paraguay to take more serious steps to combat human trafficking.

== See also ==
- Dictatorship of Alfredo Stroessner
