= Sonia Dahmani =

Tunisian lawyer, journalist, and human rights advocate

- سنية الدهماني
- Occupations: Lawyer, journalist, human rights advocate
- Known for: Cases and public commentary on human rights, freedom of expression, and racism in Tunisia
- Awards: International Press Freedom Award (2025)

Sonia Dahmani (Arabic: سنية الدهماني) is a Tunisian lawyer, journalist, and human rights advocate. She is known for her commentary on freedom of expression and racial discrimination in Tunisia, and for a series of prosecutions under the 2022 cybercrime law known as Decree 54. Her arrest on the 11th of May 2024 and subsequent court cases received extensive coverage from international media outlets and human rights organizations.

In 2025, the Committee to Protect Journalists (CPJ) named her a recipient of its International Press Freedom Award, citing her as an example of the risks faced by legal and media professionals in Tunisia.

== Early life and career ==
Dahmani is a member of the Tunisian Bar Association. She gained national visibility as a legal analyst and commentator on Tunisian television programs, where she discussed constitutional matters, civil liberties, and social issues.

Her work has included cases involving freedom of expression, detainees' rights, and discrimination, and she has contributed analysis on the justice system to various media platforms.

== Arrest and prosecutions ==
=== Background: Decree 54 ===
Dahmani's prosecutions took place under Decree 54, a 2022 law criminalizing "false information" and speech considered harmful to public officials. The decree has been widely criticized by advocacy groups, including Amnesty International and Human Rights Watch, as enabling the criminalization of dissent.

=== May 2024 arrest ===
On 11 May 2024, Dahmani was arrested at the headquarters of the Tunisian Bar Association in Tunis. Video of the arrest circulated on social media and was reported by international news agencies including Reuters, the Associated Press, and Al Jazeera.

The Tunisian Bar Association and multiple civil society organizations condemned the manner of the arrest and called for her release.

=== First prosecution: Comments on prison conditions ===
Dahmani was charged for remarks made during a television interview about sanitary conditions in Tunisian prisons. Authorities alleged that her comments defamed the prison administration.

In July 2024 she was sentenced to one year in prison, later reduced to eight months on appeal.

=== Second prosecution: Statements on racial discrimination ===
In October 2024, Dahmani received an additional two-year prison sentence in a separate case relating to public statements about discrimination against Black Tunisians and sub-Saharan migrants. International rights organizations described the case as part of a broader pattern of prosecutions under Decree 54.

On 27 November 2025, Dahmani was released from a prison in Manouba, after being imprisoned for a year and a half.

=== Third prosecution: Comments on prison conditions ===
In May 2026, Dahmani was sentenced to two years in prison for criticising conditions in Tunisian prisons during a radio interview.

== International reactions ==
Her arrest and convictions were widely reported by international media and prompted responses from human rights groups, bar associations, and political bodies.

=== Human rights organizations ===
Amnesty International, Human Rights Watch, the Human Rights Foundation, and Reporters Without Borders called for Dahmani’s release and raised concerns over restrictions on freedom of expression in Tunisia.

=== Political and legal institutions ===
Her case was discussed by members of the U.S. Congress and the European Parliament, who expressed concern about the use of Decree 54 to prosecute journalists and lawyers.

The International Commission of Jurists and several bar associations also criticized the proceedings.

=== Committee to Protect Journalists ===
In 2025, the CPJ awarded her the International Press Freedom Award, noting the global attention her case brought to freedom of expression in Tunisia.

== Impact and significance ==
Dahmani's prosecutions have been cited in international analyses of Tunisia's political situation, particularly regarding the decline of media freedom and the increased application of cybercrime legislation. Her case has been referenced in policy discussions on the state of civil liberties in North Africa.

Amnesty International and the Committee to Protect Journalists have both called for Tunisian authorities to immediately and unconditionally release Dahmani and quash the charges against her.

== Recognition ==
In 2025, Dahmani was named as among the recipients of the International Press Freedom Awards by the Committee to Protect Journalists. The CPJ described her as "a symbol of the shrinking space for dissent in Tunisia, once a beacon of media freedom".
