= Siamak Ghaderi =

Iranian journalist

- Born: ca. 1967; Iran
- Occupation: Journalist
- Years active: 18 years
- Employer: IRNA (formerly)
- Known for: Iranian freelance journalist
- Criminal charges: Charged with "propagating against the regime," "creating public anxiety," and "spreading falsehoods."
- Criminal penalty: Sentenced to four years in prison and 60 lashes
- Criminal status: Released
- Spouse: Farzaneh Mirzavand
- Awards: International Press Freedom Award of the Committee to Protect Journalists

Siamak Ghaderi (Persian: سیامک قادری; born c. 1967) is an Iranian freelance journalist and blogger, formerly an editor with the state news agency IRNA, who was arrested on July 27, 2010, and charged with crimes for covering the 2009 Iranian presidential election protests and the Green Movement protest in Tehran, Iran. Ghaderi was sentenced to 4 years and 60 lashes in Iran's Evin Prison.

== Personal ==
Ghaderi is married to Farzaneh Mirzavand and has a son, Ali.

== Career ==
Ghaderi is now a freelance journalist. He worked as an editor and reporter for Iran's official news agency IRNA 18 years. Later in his career, he created his own blog IRNA-ye maa where he reported about the protests during the 2009 election season and other news that the IRNA would not cover. Ghaderi also took a job with the Kalame website in order to cover the protest events at Hafte Tir Square and other election news. He lost his job after the election, and then started to protest on the streets. He was warned not to report what was happening on his personal blog. The last time before his arrest that he was warned on February 8, 2010.

== Notable works of journalism ==
In 2007, Ghaderi rebutted President Mahmoud Ahmadinejad's claim that there were no homosexuals in Iran. Ghaderi published his own interviews with gay Iranians online. He then set up his own blog, called IRNA-ye maa, which became his outlet for the street protests and other stories for the 2009 presidential election that were not getting published by IRNA.

Ghaderi was arrested on July 27, 2010. He was sentenced in January 2011 to four years in prison and 60 lashes on the charge of "propagation against the regime," "spreading falsehoods," "creating public anxiety". Pro-government news websites such as Rasekhoon and Highlight News called him a "seditionist" and said he was arrested for "immoral" acts. His blog was blocked by authorities before he was detained. Ghaderi was convicted three months after his arrest but was held in the Ward 209 for nine months. For the first two days in prison, he said he cried due to pain caused by several broken teeth — the result of a beating meted out when he was arrested at his home. His said his mouth kept filling up with blood. For a long period in the beginning he was not allowed any visitors and was held in solitary confinement for 33 days. He said, "They do everything to make the person confess everything. They do physical torture, such as being blindfolded which is horrible torture for the person. Pushing the head to the toilet bowl, not allowing the person to talk to his lawyer." There was also unjust punishment done to him and his family. His family waited 17–18 days to find out where he was taken from his home on the raid. Ghaderi family looked all over the city for him, in local hospitals and even morgues. On July 14, 2014, Ghaderi was released from prison.

== Impact ==
Iran is one of the world’s most prolific jailers of writers, according to Reporters Without Borders. As of July 2014, at least 65 journalists, bloggers, and social media activists were held in Iran’s prisons on various charges related to their speech or writings.

== Reactions ==
"These brave Iranians remind us of the vital role that journalists and writers play, regardless of the risks to their lives and careers, in exposing or speaking out against oppression," said Emma Daly for Reporters Without Borders.

== Awards ==
- In 2014, Ghaderi was one of five recipients of the Hellman-Hammett award for courage and conviction.
- On Tuesday, November 25, the Committee to Protect Journalists awarded Ghaderi the 2014 International Press Freedom award.

== See also ==
- Human rights in the Islamic Republic of Iran
- Controversies of Mahmoud Ahmadinejad
