= Foley (surname) =

Foley is a surname which originated in Ireland, in the southeast Munster region. The name is derived from the original modern Irish Ó Foghlú and older Irish Ó Foghladha, meaning "plunderer". The Lord of the Decies (the Waterford area of Munster) was a title attributed to some early Foleys.

== People ==
- Adrian Foley, 8th Baron Foley (1923–2012), British composer
- Anthony Foley (1973–2016), Irish rugby union player and coach
- Bernard Foley (born 1989), Australian rugby player
- Bill Foley (photojournalist), American photojournalist
- Blaze Foley (1949–1989), American singer
- Brendan Foley (filmmaker), Irish writer, producer and director
- Brendan Foley (rugby union) (born 1950), Irish rugby player
- Brian Foley (disambiguation)
- Brody Foley (born 2003), American football player
- C. Fritz Foley, American economist
- Caroline Rhys Davids (1857–1942), née Foley, English scholar and translator
- Charles Foley (disambiguation)
- Chris Foley (politician) (born 1956), Australian politician, independent member of the Queensland Legislative Assembly
- Chris Foley (musician), American drummer for Boston hardcore bands SSD and DYS
- Christopher Foley (born 1974), also known as Kidd Chris, American radio show host
- Cornelia MacIntyre Foley (1909–2010), American artist
- Curry Foley (1856–1898), Irish baseball player
- Cyril Foley (1868–1936), English cricketer, military officer and archaeologist
- Dave Foley (born 1963), Canadian actor
- David Foley (born 1987), English professional footballer
- David Edward Foley (1930–2018), American Roman Catholic bishop
- Denis Foley (1934–2013), Irish politician
- Dennis Foley, American military fiction writer
- Des Foley (1940–1995), Irish sportsman and politician
- Dominic Foley (born 1976), Irish former professional footballer
- Duncan K. Foley (born 1942), American economist
- Ellen Foley (born 1951), American singer and actress
- Fiona Foley (born 1964), Australian artist
- Francis B. Foley (1887–1973), American ferrous metallurgist
- Frank Foley (1884–1958), British Secret Intelligence Service officer who helped thousands of Jewish families escape from Germany before the start of World War II
- Frank Foley (politician) (1922–1981), Canadian politician and educator
- Frederick Foley (1891–1966), American physician, designer of the Foley Catheter
- Gaelen Foley (born 1973), American writer
- Gary Foley (born 1950), Australian activist and academic
- Gerry Foley (1932–2021), American-born Canadian ice hockey player
- Glenn Foley (born 1970), American football player
- Henry Foley (disambiguation)
- Jack Foley (basketball) (1939–2020), American basketball player
- Jack Foley (poet) (1940–2025), American poet
- Jack Foley (sound effects artist) (1891–1967), American sound effects specialist
- James Foley (disambiguation)
- Jason Foley (born 1995), American baseball player
- Jennifer Crystal Foley (born 1973), American actress
- Jessica Foley (born 1983), Australian basketball player
- Jim Foley (born 1946), Canadian football player
- Joe Foley (born 1955), American women's basketball coach
- John Foley (disambiguation)
- Joseph Foley (c. 1821–?), Irish solicitor and nationalist politician
- Joseph P. Foley (1872–1928), Canadian politician
- Kevin Foley (disambiguation)
- Laurence Foley (1942–2002), American diplomat
- Lelia Foley (born 1942), first African-American woman elected mayor in the United States
- Leo Foley (1928–2016), American politician and state senator from Minnesota
- Linda Foley (born 1955), American journalist and labor leader
- Louise Munro Foley (1933–2021), American writer
- Lucy Foley (born 1986), American author
- Luke Foley (born 1970), Australian politician
- Mark Foley (born 1954), US congressman from Florida
- Mark Foley (Cork hurler) (born 1967), Irish former hurler
- Mark Foley (Limerick hurler) (born 1975), Irish former hurler
- Martin Foley (criminal) (born 1952), Irish criminal
- Margaret Foley (1827–1877), American sculptor
- Margaret Foley (suffragist) (1875–1957), Irish-American labor organizer, suffragist, and social worker
- Maurice Foley (politician) (1925–2002), British politician
- Maurice Foley (sportsman) (1930–2013), Australian cricketer and field hockey player
- Maurice B. Foley (born 1960), Chief Judge of the United States Tax Court
- Michael Foley (disambiguation), multiple people
- Mike Foley (Australian politician) (born 1946), Tasmanian politician
- Mike Foley (Nebraska politician) (born 1954), American politician
- Mick Foley (born 1965), American professional wrestler
- Mick Foley (born 1965), American professional wrestler
- Mick Foley (footballer) (1892–?), Irish footballer
- Mick Foley (public servant) (1923–1975), Australian public servant
- Nathan Foley (footballer) (born 1985), Australian rules footballer
- Nathan Foley (singer) (born 1979), Australian singer/songwriter, member of the children's group Hi-5
- Norma Foley (born 1970), Irish politician
- Pat Foley (born 1954), American former sports broadcaster
- Patrick Foley, drummer for the American-British band As It Is
- Patrick Foley (1858–1926), Roman Catholic professor, priest and Bishop of Kildare and Leighlin
- Paul Foley (disambiguation)
- Peter Foley (snowboarding) (born 1965 or 1966), American former snowboarding coach; suspended for 10 years for sexual misconduct
- Philip Foley (1648–1716), British ironmaster and politician
- Red Foley (1910–1968), American country music singer, musician
- Richard Foley (disambiguation)
- Richie Foley (born 1987), Irish hurler
- Rick Foley (1945–2015), Canadian ice hockey player
- Robert Foley (disambiguation)
- Sylvester R. Foley Jr. (1928–2019), American four-star admiral
- Sallie Foley, American psychotherapist, social worker and social work academic
- Samuel Foley (bishop) (1655–1695), bishop of Down and Connor
- Samuel J. Foley (politician) (1862–1922), New York politician
- Samuel J. Foley (district attorney) (1891–1951), Bronx County district attorney
- Sam Foley (born 1986), Irish-English footballer
- Sara Rowsey Foley (1840-1925), American biographer
- Scott Foley (born 1972), American actor
- Stephan A. Foley, American judge, namesake of Stephan A. Foley House in Lincoln, Illinois
- Steve Foley (disambiguation)
- Sue Foley (born 1968), Canadian blues musician
- Theo Foley (1937–2020), Irish footballer and football manager
- Theodore Foley (1913–1974), American-Italian Roman Catholic priest
- Tom or Thomas Foley (disambiguation)
- Thos Foley (born 1979), Irish snow skier
- Victoria Foley, American politician from Maine
- Will Foley (footballer) (born 1960), Scottish footballer
- William Foley (disambiguation)
- Zac Foley (1970–2002), bassist for the band EMF

== Fictional characters ==
- Axel Foley, in the Beverly Hills Cop franchise
- Joshua Foley, Marvel Comics character also known as Elixir
- Justin Foley, in the novel and Netflix series 13 Reasons Why
- Matt Foley, from Saturday Night Live
- Richie Foley, a character from Static Shock
- Tucker Foley, one of the main characters of Danny Phantom
- Miss Foley, a character in the novel Something Wicked This Way Comes

== See also ==
- Sean Reid-Foley (born 1995), American baseball player
- Foli, a given name and surname
- Foly, a surname
