= Foley =

Foley may refer to:

== Places ==
=== United States ===
- Foley, Alabama
- Foley, Florida, a community in Taylor County, Florida
- Foley, Minnesota
- Foley, Missouri
- Foley Field, a baseball stadium in Athens, Georgia
- Foley Square, Manhattan

=== Elsewhere ===
- Foley Island, Nunavut, Canada
- Foley Mountain, Ontario, Canada
- Foley, County Armagh, a townland in County Armagh, Northern Ireland

== People and fictional characters ==
- Foley (surname), a list of people and fictional characters
- Baron Foley, a British title
- Foley baronets, an extinct British baronetcy
- Foley (musician), American musician and singer Joseph Lee McCreary Jr. (born 1962)
- Jack Foley (sound effects artist), sound effects artist after whom the craft is named

== Ships ==
- HMS Foley, two British Royal Navy frigates
- USS Foley (DE-270), a United States Navy destroyer escort, originally HMS Foley

== Other uses ==
- Doris Foley Library for Historical Research, reference and research library in Nevada City, California, U.S.
- Foley (band), New Zealand pop duo
- Foley (sound design), a process or a studio for creating sound effects used to enhance film or video soundtrack
- Foley catheter, the most common type of indwelling urinary catheter

== See also ==
- Foli, a surname and given name
- Foly, a surname
- Foley's department store of Houston, Texas
- Foley Building (disambiguation)
