= William Foley =

William Foley may refer to:

- William Foley (American football) (fl. 1900s), former American football coach
- William Foley (artist) (1926–2020), American artist
- William Foley (bishop) (1931–1991), Australian bishop and Archbishop
- William Foley (cricketer) (1906–1963), South African cricketer
- William A. Foley (born 1949), American linguist
- Will Foley (baseball) (1855–1916), baseball player
- William R. Foley (1908–1988), American politician
- Bill Foley (photojournalist), American photojournalist
- Bill Foley (businessman) (born 1944), American businessman; chairman of Fidelity National Financial and owner of the Vegas Golden Knights
- Brian Foley (hymnist) (William Brian Foley, 1919–2000), Roman Catholic priest and hymnodist
- William J. Foley (1887–1952), American attorney and politician
- William J. Foley Jr. (1923–1984), his son, American politician, member of the Boston City Council
- William James Foley, British colonial police officer
- William Foley (priest) (1854–1944), Archdeacon of Ardfert
- Will Foley (footballer) (born 1960), Scottish footballer
- Will Foley (mayor), mayor of Central Hawke's Bay District in New Zealand
