= Robert Foley =

Bob or Robert Foley may refer to:

- Bob Foley (1928–2019), American admiral
- Bob Foley (basketball), basketball coach in the 1980s and 1990s of Providence Friars women's basketball
- Bob Foley (sailor), sailor, see Soling North American Championship results (1980–1989)
- Bobby Foley (actor), voice actor in Sand Land
- Bobby Foley (artist), did artwork of LA Bootleg 1984
- Robbie Foley, hurler in the 2006 Christy Ring Cup final
- Robby Foley (born 1996), American race car driver
- Robert Foley (academic) (born 1953), British anthropologist and archaeologist
- Robert Foley (American politician) (born 1953), politician from Maine
- Robert Foley (footballer) (born 1946), Ghanaian footballer
- Robert Foley (ironmonger) (1624–1676), English ironmonger and High Sheriff
- Robert Foley (priest) (died 1783), Dean of Worcester Cathedral
- Robert Foley (MP) (1651–1702), English ironmonger and politician
- Robert F. Foley (born 1941), Medal of Honor recipient
- Robert Carl Foley (born 1956) American serial killer
