= Jack Foley =

Jack Foley may refer to:

- Jack Foley (basketball) (1939–2020), American basketball player
- Jack Foley (sound effects artist) (1891–1967), pioneering American sound effects specialist
- Jack Foley (poet) (1940–2025), American poet

== See also ==
- John Foley (disambiguation)
