= Michael Foley =

Michael Foley may refer to:

- Michael Foley (academic) (1948–2016), international relations scholar
- Michael Foley (American football) (born 1955), American football coach at Colgate University
- Michael Foley (cricketer) (c. 1854–1922), New Zealand soldier, cricketer, hotel keeper and horse-racing administrator
- Michael Foley (cyclist) (born 1999), Canadian cyclist
- Michael Foley (Kildare footballer), Irish Gaelic footballer
- Michael Foley (Leitrim footballer), Irish Gaelic footballer
- Michael Foley (Ohio politician) (born 1963), Ohio (U.S.) politician
- Michael Foley (rugby union) (born 1967), Australian rugby player
- Michael Hamilton Foley (1820–1870), Canadian politician
- Mick Foley (born 1965), American professional wrestler
- Mick Foley (footballer) (1892–?), Irish footballer
- Mick Foley (public servant) (1923–1975), Australian public servant
- Mike Foley (Australian politician) (born 1946), Tasmanian politician
- Mike Foley (Nebraska politician) (born 1954), Nebraska (U.S.) politician
