= Admiral Foley =

Admiral Foley may refer to:

- Paul Foley (admiral) (1909–1990), U.S. Navy rear admiral
- Sylvester R. Foley Jr. (1928–2019), U.S. Navy admiral
- Thomas Foley (Royal Navy officer) (1757–1833), British Royal Navy admiral
