= Kenswick =

Kenswick may refer to:

- Kenswick, Worcestershire
- Kenswick, Texas
