= Paul Foley =

Paul Foley may refer to:

- Paul Foley (ironmaster) (1644/5–1699), English ironmaster who also served as speaker of the British House of Commons
- Paul Foley (politician) (1688–1739), English politician, second son of the ironmaster
- Paul Foley of Prestwood (died 1739), eldest son of Philip Foley
- Paul Foley (cricketer) (1857–1928), English cricketer, cricket administrator and barrister
- Paul Foley (admiral) (1909–1990), rear admiral in the United States Navy
- Paul Foley (executive) (1914–1983), American CEO of Interpublic Group of Companies
- Paul Foley (golfer) (born 1959), Australian golfer
- Paul "Eagle Eye" Foley, a playable character in the Conflict series
