= Charles Foley =

Charles Foley may refer to:

- Charles Foley (inventor) (1931–2013), invented the game Twister, together with Neil W. Rabens
- Charles Foley (journalist) (1908–1995), Indian-born British journalist
- Charles F. Foley (c. 1868–1932), American lawyer and politician
- Charles Foley (cricketer) (1856–1933), English cricketer and solicitor
