= Henry Foley =

Henry Foley may refer to:

== Cricketers ==
- Henry Foley (English cricketer) (1905–1959), left-hand bat for Worcestershire
- Henry Foley (New Zealand cricketer) (1906–1948), left-hand bat for Wellington

== Others ==
- Henry Foley (historian) (1811–1891), English Jesuit church historian
- Henry Foley, 5th Baron Foley (1850–1905), British peer
- Henry Foley (1917–1985), English man killed in police custody (Death of Henry Foley)
- Henry M. Foley (1918–1982), American experimental physicist

== See also ==
- Henry Foley Knight (1918–1982), British administrator; Governor of Madras in 1946
