= Calvary Hospital (Bronx) =

Hospital in New York City, United States

Coordinates: 40°50′52.9″N 73°50′38.8″W

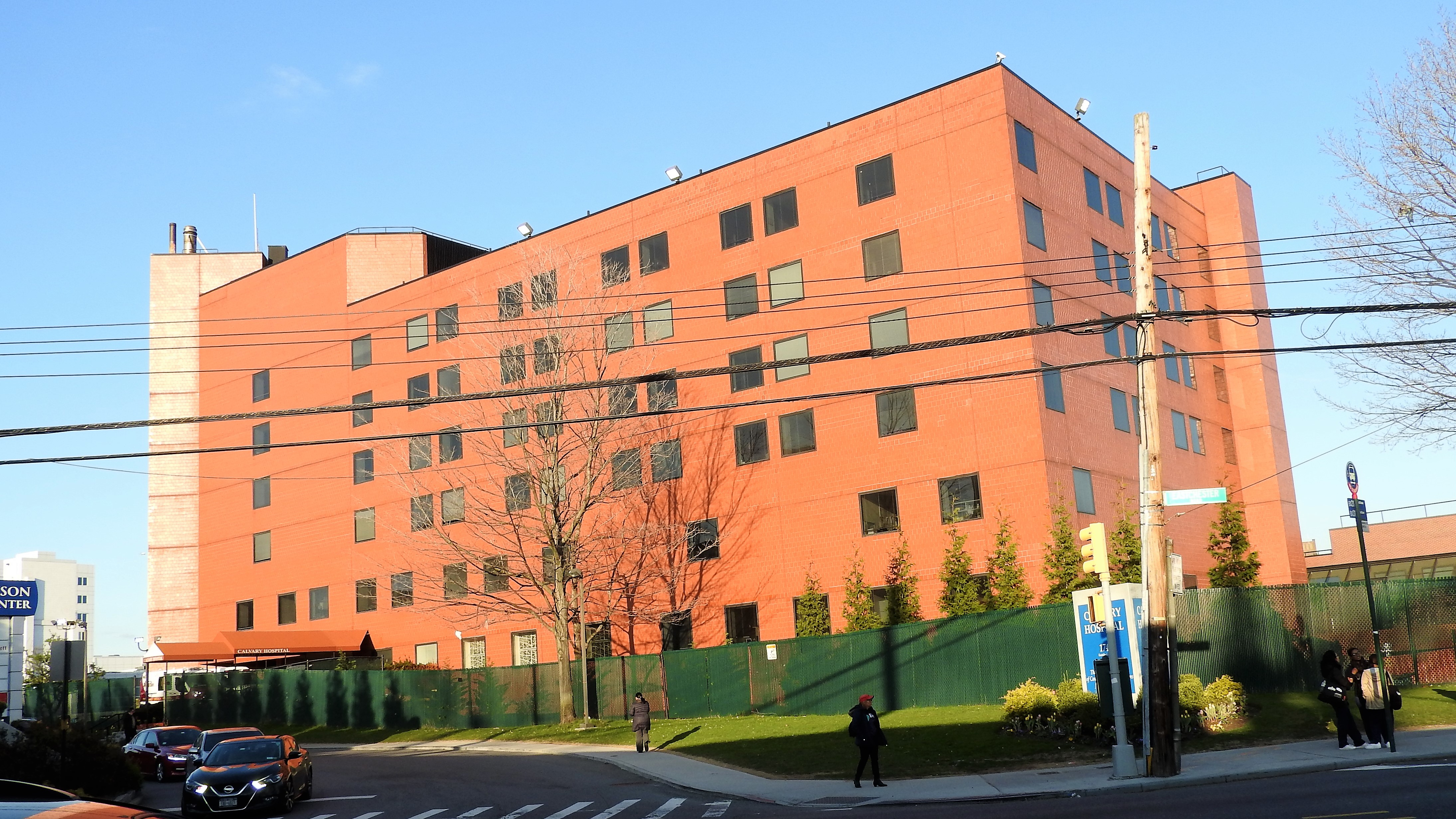

Geography
- Location: 1740 Eastchester Road; Morris Park 10461, The Bronx, New York, United States

Organization
- Care system: Private
- Type: Teaching

Services
- Beds: 225
- Speciality: Hospice and palliative care, affiliated with the Roman Catholic Archdiocese of New York

History
- Opened: 1899

Links
- Website: www.calvaryhospital.org
- Lists: Hospitals in New York State
- Other links: Hospitals in The Bronx

Calvary Hospital is an American non-profit institution specializing in hospice, palliative and end of life care, headquartered in the Bronx, a borough of New York City, New York. The hospital has a total of 225 beds.

== History ==
Calvary Hospital was founded in 1899 and is operated in connection with the Roman Catholic Archdiocese of New York. The hospital was one of the first, and is still one of the largest, medical complexes focusing on end-of-life hospice care.

In addition to its main facility in Morris Park, Bronx it has had a 25-bed facility within the Lutheran Medical Center in Sunset Park, Brooklyn since 2001. It also has various outreach programs.

Calvary Hospital operates a third location, the Dawn Greene Hospice, a 10-bed facility located on the 15th Floor of Mary Manning Walsh Home (MMW) on the Upper East Side of Manhattan.

== Deaths of notable people ==
- Ronald Alexander (1917–1995), playwright
- Alan Betrock (1950–2000), music critic and publisher
- Chad Brown (1961–2014), poker player
- James Carter Cathcart (1954–2025), voice actor for Pokemon
- Thomas A. Duffy (1906–1979), judge, lawyer, and politician
- Xavier Gonzalez (1898–1993), artist
- Larry Harlow (1939–2021), salsa music performer, composer, and producer
- Ellen Holly (1931–2023), actress
- Robert Hughes (1938–2012), art critic, writer, and television producer
- Caroline R. Jones (1942–2001), female African-American advertising executive
- Hank Jones (1918–2010), jazz musician (pianist)
- Randy Jones (1944–2016), jazz musician (drummer)
- Tom Konchalski (1947–2021), basketball scout
- Lewis H. Michaux (1885–1976), bookseller and civil rights activist
- Andrew P. O'Rourke (1933–2013), judge and politician
- Stay High 149 (Wayne Roberts) (1950 - 2012), graffiti artist
- Soupy Sales (1926–2009), actor, comedian
- Richard Tee (1943–1993), pianist, studio musician, singer and arranger
- Yomo Toro (1933–2012), musician
- Guy J. Velella (1944–2011), New York State Senator

== See also ==
- List of hospitals in the Bronx
