= Robert Foley (ironmonger) =

English ironmonger

Robert Foley (baptised 19 September 1624; buried 1 December 1676) of Stourbridge was a son of Richard Foley, the most important ironmaster of his time in the west Midlands, by his second marriage (to Alice Brindley).

In contrast with other members of the family who became ironmasters, Robert Foley became an ironmonger, that is, a person who organises the manufacture of finished ironware and sells it. In doing so he may have been taking over that aspect of his father's business, just as his older brother Thomas Foley had taken over their father's ironworks. Shortly after the English Restoration, Foley obtained a contract from the Navy Board to supply ironware to several dockyards.

His house at Stourbridge and estate at Netherton in Dudley were given him by his father. He probably mined coal in his land at Yorks Park, near Netherton around 1660, but left others to extend mines into neighbouring land. However he bought the manor of Kenswick in Knightwick himself in 1669.

He was High Sheriff of Worcestershire in 1671. He married first Anne Blurton in 1645 and was succeeded by his son, another Robert Foley. He married second Elizabeth Duppa.

Foley died on a business trip. He traveled from his home in Stourbridge to Bristol and then to London, where he died at his inn.
