= Paul Foley (executive) =

American businessman (1914–1983)

Paul Foley (March 12, 1914 – October 30, 1983) was an American business executive in the advertising industry. He was chairman and CEO of the Interpublic Group of Companies (IPG) and was inducted into the AAF Advertising Hall of Fame.

== Early life and education ==
Foley completed a journalism degree at the University of Notre Dame in Indiana.

== Career ==
Foley started his career in journalism, as a police reporter for the Chicago American. His first foray into advertising was at The Pontiac Press in Pontiac, Michigan. In 1940, he went into advertising full time at Grace & Bement.

During World War II, Foley served in Istanbul as bureau chief for the United States Office of War Information. After the war, he joined an advertising agency, McManus, John & Adams, in Bloomfield Hills, Michigan, where he was a creative director. By 1955, he was an executive vice president and board member at the firm.

He left McManus to manage the Detroit office of McCann-Erickson, eventually moving to New York. In 1964, he was appointed chairman of McCann-Erickson.

In 1971, Foley was named president and CEO of Interpublic, and later became chairman. By 1977, he had given up the title of president. In 1979, he stepped out of the role of chief executive but remained on the board as a director and chairman of the finance committee.

Over the course of his career, he influenced and was involved in successful advertising campaigns for Pontiac, Buick, Coca-Cola, Exxon, Nabisco, Del Monte, and Nestle. During his tenure as chairman, he announced Interpublic's affiliation with Mingo, Jones, Guilmenot, a black-owned agency co-founded by Caroline R. Jones.

== Board memberships ==
Foley became a trustee of the University of Notre Dame in 1969. From 1977 to 1979, he was a trustee of St. Vincent's Hospital in Manhattan.

== Personal life and death ==
Foley was married twice and had three children by his first marriage. He died on October 30, 1983, at Lenox Hill Hospital in Manhattan. He was survived by five grandchildren.
