= Richard Foley =

Richard Foley may refer to:

- Richard Foley (ironmaster) (1580–1657), English ironmaster
- Richard Foley (philosopher) (b1947}, American philosopher and Emeritus Professor of Philosophy at New York University
- Richard Foley (politician) (1681–1732), English lawyer and MP for Droitwich
- Richie Foley, Irish hurler
- Richard T. Foley, discoverer of the Richard T. Foley Site, an archaeological site

== See also ==
- Rick Foley, Canadian ice hockey player
- Richie Foley, fictional character in Gear (Static Shock)
