= Brian Foley =

Brian Foley may refer to:

- Brian Foley (bishop) (1910–1999), English Roman Catholic bishop of Lancaster
- Brian Foley (Coronation Street), Fictional character
- Brian Foley (footballer) (1933–1998), Australian rules footballer
- Brian Foley (hymnist) (1919–2000), Roman Catholic priest and hymnist
- Brian Foley (racing driver) (born 1932)
- Brian X. Foley (born 1957), American politician in the New York State Senate
- Brian Foley, American healthcare magnate and husband of Lisa Wilson-Foley
