= Cary Vaughan =

American English language instructor and journalist

- Occupations: Teacher, journalist
- Known for: Work on behalf of Terry A. Anderson
- Spouse: Bill Foley
- Awards: International Press Freedom Award (1991)

Cary Vaughan is an American English language instructor and journalist best known for her role in the Terry A. Anderson hostage crisis in Lebanon.

An instructor at the American University of Beirut and a part-time worker at Associated Press bureau there, Vaughan and her husband Bill Foley, an AP photojournalist, were friends with Anderson. Following his abduction by Hezbollah militants, they worked toward his release. For their efforts, they received two of the first International Press Freedom Awards from the Committee to Protect Journalists in 1991.
