= Voice foley =

Voice foley is the non-talking "Foley" or sound effects, that a voice actor makes to enhance a performance. Such sounds include grunts, gasps growls, groans, roars, breaths, wheezing, humming and many more, usually in animals and other creatures.

== See also ==
- Count Cutelli
- Michael Winslow
- Foley (filmmaking)
- Voice acting in Japan
