= Robert Foley (MP) =

Robert Foley (c.1651–1702) of Stourbridge was the son of Robert Foley (d. 1676).

== Biography ==
He succeeded to his father's business as an ironmonger and naval contractor for ironware. His contract with the Navy Board has been printed, and lists 30 different kinds of nails and nearly 60 other species of iron goods. However, he lost his contract to the rising Ambrose Crowley.

He also inherited from his father a fine house in Stourbridge High Street (next door to the Talbot Inn, but now incorporated into the Talbot Hotel); an estate at Netherton in Dudley; and the manor of Kenswick in Knightwick. He settled the latter (at least) on his marriage to Anne daughter of Dudley Lord North. There were several children including Dudley Foley and his heir North Foley.

The second Robert represented the rotten borough of Grampound from 1685 to 1689, a period when his ironmaster relatives (such as Paul Foley) were out of Parliament.

Parliament of England
Preceded by John Tanner; Nicholas Herle	Member of Parliament for Grampound; 1685–1689; With: Sir Joseph Tredenham	Succeeded by Edward Herle; John Tanner
