= Steve Foley =

Steve Foley may refer to:

- Steve Foley (Australian footballer) (1902–1948), Australian rules footballer with Fitzroy
- Steve Foley (defensive back) (born 1953), American football player for the Denver Broncos, 1976–1986
- Steve Foley (diver) (born 1957), Australian Olympic diver and diving coach
- Steve Foley (drummer) (1959–2008), drummer for The Replacements
- Steve Foley (footballer, born 1953), English association football coach
- Steve Foley (footballer, born 1962), English association football player
- Steve Foley (linebacker) (born 1975), American football player for the Cincinnati Bengals, Houston Texans and San Diego Chargers, 1998–2006

== See also ==
- Steven Foley-Sheridan (born 1986), Irish footballer
