= C. Fritz Foley =

American economist

C. Fritz Foley is an American economist who is currently the André R. Jakurski Professor of Business Administration at the Harvard Business School.

== Education ==
- 2002 Ph.D., Business Economics, Harvard University
- 1999 A.M., Economics, Harvard University
- 1993 B.A., Ethics, Politics and Economics, Yale University
