= Caroline R. Jones =

American advertising executive (1942–2001)

- Born: February 15, 1942; Benton Harbor, Michigan, U.S.
- Died: June 28, 2001 (aged 59); New York City, U.S.
- Education: University of Michigan
- Occupation: Advertising executive
- Organization(s): J. Walter Thompson, BBDO, Zebra Associates, Mingo-Jones, Caroline Jones Advertising

Caroline Robinson Jones (February 15, 1942 – June 28, 2001) was among the first female African-American advertising figures.

== Life ==
Caroline Robinson Jones was born in Benton Harbor, Michigan on February 15, 1942. She graduated from the University of Michigan in Ann Arbor, Michigan and went on to work for advertising agencies such as J. Walter Thompson and BBDO. Jones later founded agencies that specialized in minority advertising, making her among the first to do so. She helped found Caroline Jones Advertising, Zebra Associates, and Mingo-Jones, among the first agencies to be created by primarily African American executives and also among the first to focus on minority advertising. Clients of Caroline Jones Advertising included American Express, the National Urban League, and Miller High Life. In 1979, her agency developed the slogan "We Do Chicken Right!" for Kentucky Fried Chicken (now KFC). Jones died of breast cancer in 2001 at Calvary Hospital in The Bronx.
