= James Foley =

James Foley may refer to:

- James Foley (bishop) (born 1948), Australian Roman Catholic bishop
- James Foley (cricketer) (1898–1969), Irish cricketer
- James Foley (director) (1953–2025), American film director and screenwriter
- James Foley (journalist) (1973–2014), American journalist, beheaded by ISIL in 2014
- James A. Foley (1882–1946), American lawyer and politician from New York
- James Bradford Foley (1807–1886), United States Representative from Indiana
- James Brendan Foley (born 1957), American diplomat
- James D. Foley (born 1942), American university professor in the field of human-computer interaction
- James L. Foley Jr. (1885–1960), American politician and farmer
- James Thomas Foley (1910–1990), American judge
- James Foley (author) (born 1982), Western Australian children's writer and illustrator

== See also ==
- Jim Foley (born 1946), Canadian football player
