= HMS Foley =

HMS Foley has been the name of two ships of the Royal Navy:

- HMS Foley (BDE-22), a frigate constructed in the United States originally intended for service in the Royal Navy but instead retained by the United States Navy, in which she served as the destroyer escort USS Wileman (DE-22) from 1943 to 1945
- HMS Foley (K474), a frigate in commission from 1943 to 1945
