= Richard Foley (ironmaster) =

English ironmaster (1580–1657)

Richard Foley (1580–1657) was a prominent English ironmaster. He is best known from the folktale of "Fiddler Foley", which is either not correct or does not apply to him.

== Ironmaster ==
Richard was the son of another Richard Foley (1551–1600), a nailer at Dudley, though the son is likely to have traded in nails rather than making them. In the 1620s, he became a partner in a network of ironworks in south Staffordshire, which were undoubtedly the source of the family's fortune.

== "Fiddler Foley" ==
According to the folktale, "Fiddler Foley", he went to Sweden where, posing as a simple fiddler, he succeeded in discovering the secret of the slitting mill, which was enabling the price of English nails to be undercut. He returned home and set up a slitting mill at Hyde Mill in Kinver, thus making his fortune. Unfortunately, the earliest version of the legend, while applying to Hyde Mill, referred not to Richard Foley, but to a member of the Brindley family, who owned the mill until the 1730s. This may possibly have been George Brindley, Richard's brother-in-law. Richard certainly leased Hyde Mill in 1627 and converted it to a slitting mill, though it was not the first in England or even in the Midlands.

== Family ==
Richard Foley married twice, and was able to set up several of his sons as gentlemen or in other prominent positions.

By his first marriage:

- Richard Foley (1608–c1680) of Birmingham, and then an ironmaster at Longton in north Staffordshire. He died without issue, bequeathing Longdon to his uncle John Foley (died 1690) of London; it later passed to Richard's half-brother Thomas.

By his second marriage to Alice (died 1663), daughter of Sir William Brindley of Willenhall, he had a large family:

- Anne married William Normansell of Wolverhampton
- Edward of Dudley
- Priscilla (died 1687) married 1. Ezekiel Wallis of Bristol and 2. Henry Glover of Oldswinford
- Thomas Foley (1616–1677), another prominent ironmaster, whose descendant was elevated to the peerage as Baron Foley.
- Honor married Henry Pretty of Ireland
- Margaret married Edward Tyson of Bristol.
- Robert Foley (died 1676), ironmonger
- Samuel Foley, a cleric, of Clonmel and Dublin
- Sarah married 1. John Baker and 2. George Hill of Bridgnorth
- John Foley (1631–c. 1684), a Turkey merchant, i.e. a trader with the Levant.

Foley's own pretensions to gentility were not recognized by the College of Arms, his right to use the arms he claimed being denied at the visitation of Worcestershire in 1634.
