= John Foley =

John Foley may refer to:

== Arts ==
- John Foley (author) (1917–1974), British soldier and author
- John Foley (Jesuit) (born 1939), American Jesuit priest and songwriter of Catholic liturgical music
- John Henry Foley (1818–1874), Irish sculptor
- John Miles Foley (1947–2012), American folklorist

== Military ==
- Sir John Foley (British Army officer) (born 1939), former Chief of Defence Intelligence and Lieutenant-Governor of Guernsey
- John D. Foley (1918–1999), American bomber gunner in World War II
- John H. Foley (1839–1874), American soldier and Medal of Honor recipient
- John Foley (major) (1813–1881), Irish-born soldier and merchant

== Religion ==
- John Foley (Monsignor) (1854–1937), priest, educator and President of Carlow College
- John Patrick Foley (1935–2011), Roman Catholic cardinal
- John Samuel Foley (1833–1918), third Catholic bishop of Detroit, for whom Bishop Foley Catholic High School in Madison Heights, Michigan, is named

== Sports ==
- John Foley (American football), former American college football linebacker
- John Foley (baseball) (1857–?), baseball player
- John Foley (rugby league) (1878–1949), rugby league footballer of the 1900s, and 1910s for Wales, and Ebbw Vale
- John Foley (rugby union) (born 1997), Irish rugby union player

== Other ==
- John P. Foley (judge) (1938–1984), American lawyer and judge
- John R. Foley (1917–2001), U.S. congressman from Maryland
- John Foley (bushranger) (1833–1891), Australian convict
- John Foley (executive) (born 1971), American billionaire businessman

== See also ==
- Jack Foley (disambiguation)
