= Robert Carl Foley =

American serial killer (born 1956)

- Born: September 13, 1956 (age 70); Harlan, Kentucky, U.S.
- Other name: Robert Karl Lee Foley
- Status: Incarcerated on death row
- Convictions: Murder (7 counts); Assault (2 counts)
- Penalty: 1977; 35 years' imprisonment 1993; Death; 1994; Death

Details
- Victims: 7–9+
- Span of crimes: 1976–1991
- State: Kentucky

Robert Carl Foley (born September 13, 1956) is an American serial killer and death row prisoner convicted of seven murders between 1976 and 1991 in Kentucky. Foley first killed Zetler Fields in a 1976 shooting case where he also wounded two men. Foley was found guilty of Fields's murder and sentenced to 35 years' imprisonment, but was paroled after serving four years.

Afterwards, Foley committed a quadruple murder in 1989, killing Kimberly Bowersock, Lillian Contino, Jerry McMillen, and Calvin Reynolds inside a cabin in Laurel County. Two years later, Foley also killed a pair of brothers, Rodney and Lynn Vaughn, during a party at his Laurel County house in 1991, a case that ultimately led to his arrest. Foley remains a suspect behind several more murders, including the 1988 unsolved killing of a police officer.

Foley was put on trial for the murders of the Vaughn brothers and the 1989 quadruple murder case, and in both cases, he was found guilty and sentenced to death. Foley is currently on Kentucky's death row awaiting execution.

== Personal life ==
Robert Carl Foley was born in Harlan, Kentucky, on September 13, 1956. Foley, who had three brothers, had a rough childhood and grew up in poverty. His father reportedly worked in a landfill and also drove the coal truck to make a living and support the family. When Foley was 12 years old, his grandmother and step-grandfather were charged and found guilty of the murder of a state trooper, who arrested one of their sons (Foley's uncle) in a previous case. At one point in his life, Foley allegedly became a FBI informant.

== First murder and early crimes ==
On April 17, 1976, in Harlan, Kentucky, Robert Foley committed his first murder. On that day, Foley fatally shot 22-year-old Zetler Fields Jr., and during the same shooting, Foley also shot another two men, 17-year-old Jimmy Joe Ball and 20-year-old Wendell Hale. Foley was arrested and charged with second-degree murder.

Foley was set to stand trial on March 17, 1977. The trial went forward as scheduled, and the testimony phase concluded on that same day.

On March 19, 1977, Foley was found guilty of Fields's murder and two counts of first-degree assault for the shootings of Ball and Hale. He was sentenced to a total of 35 years in prison. Foley was incarcerated at the Kentucky State Reformatory thereafter, where he served four years before he was paroled in 1981.

After his release, Foley continued to commit crimes. In 1984, he was convicted and sentenced to 15 months' imprisonment in Ohio for charges of assault and possession of a firearm by a felon offender, and he was released in December 1985. He was similarly charged with assault in two separate incidents in 1988 and 1989 respectively. These charges were still pending in court as of 1991, the same year when he was arrested as a suspect for multiple murders.

== Subsequent murders ==
Between 1988 and 1991, Robert Foley committed multiple murders in different locations across the Commonwealth of Kentucky.

=== 1989 Laurel County quadruple murder ===
On October 8, 1989, Foley committed a quadruple murder inside a cabin in Laurel County.

On that day, Foley and an acquaintance arrived at the cabin, where it was occupied by eight people. When the group were seated together inside the room, Foley attacked Kimberly "Kim" Bowersock and grabbed her by the hair, and when one of the members, Calvin Reynolds, tried to intervene, Foley brandished his gun and open fire multiple times, first shooting and killing Bowersock, before killing Reynolds and two more victims: Lillian Contino and Jerry McMillen. After the deaths of the four victims, Foley disposed of the bodies in a septic tank with the abetment of David Gross, the cabin owner, and Foley's acquaintance, and the septic tank was thereafter covered with lime and cement.

According to the Commonwealth, Foley had murdered Bowersock because he believed that she accused him of growing and selling marijuana, which caused him to get into trouble with his parole officer, and the other three deceased victims were killed due to them witnessing the shooting of Bowersock, and Foley wanted to silence them. The bodies were not found until two years later, when they were dug out by the authorities during a search conducted after Foley's arrest for an unrelated 1991 double murder.

=== 1991 Vaughn brothers murders ===
On August 17, 1991, Foley killed a pair of brothers, Harry Lynn Vaughn (also known as Lynn Vaughn) and Rodney Vaughn at his house in Laurel County.

On that day, Foley and the two brothers attended a party where they were accompanied by another eight attendees and five children. Prior to the session, Foley continued to keep his .38 Colt snub-nose revolver concealed in the small of his back under his belt, even after the rest of the attendees kept their respective firearms locked away in the kitchen cabinet. After consuming a large amount of alcohol, Foley turned aggressive and got into a fistfight with one of the Vaughn brothers, Rodney, and it was quickly broken up. Although Foley asked Lynn to bring Rodney home, they later shook hands before the party resumed. However, a second fight happened between Rodney and Foley again.

During this second fight, Foley drew his gun and shot Rodney six times, and Rodney sustained multiple gunshot wounds to the left arm and trunk, which led to multiple hemorrhage and in turn caused Rodney's death. Shortly after, Foley also shot Lynn, and due to multiple gunshot wounds to the head and extremities, Lynn also died at the scene. In his version of events, Foley claimed he killed Rodney in self-defence because the latter aimed a gun at him and threatened to shoot him, while he claimed Lynn was not killed by him, but rather by one of the guests. After the shootings, Foley ordered the witnesses to clean up the crime scene and dispose of the Vaughns' bodies in Sinking Creek in Laurel County.

=== Suspected murders ===
Apart from the confirmed murders linked to him, Foley was named a suspect in the 1988 murder of a police officer. In this case, Kentucky State Trooper John Edrington was shot to death on December 20, 1988, and the murder weapon used was the victim's own .357 Magnum revolver, and it was speculated that prior to his death, Edrington had stopped a speeding motorist, and a medical examiner ruled out the possibility of suicide in July 1989. Foley was questioned for the case after his arrest in 1991, but he was not formally charged for the crime.

Foley was also the prime suspect behind the murder of another man in 1990, and the body of the victim, David Gross, was found buried in Foley's house. Gross, then 43 years old, was shot to death in October 1990 during a dispute in which he allegedly stabbed Foley in his home. He was also a witness of the 1989 quadruple murder, and according to the police, they found not only his body, but also a gun believed to have been used to kill the four victims in the 1989 case.

== Death penalty trials ==
=== Charges ===
On August 20, 1991, three days after the murder of the Vaughn brothers, Robert Foley was charged with the double murder, and he pleaded not guilty to the charges.

On October 27, 1991, Foley was additionally charged with four counts of murder for the 1989 case, after the police found the victims' bodies buried in the septic tank where Foley disposed of their bodies back in 1989.

=== First trial ===
On August 24, 1991, Foley's charges for the Vaughn brothers case were forwarded before a Laurel County grand jury, and he was later indicted for the double murder.

On August 23, 1993, the jury selection phase officially commenced for Foley's trial in the Vaughn brothers case. A 12-member jury was assembled after less than a week.

On September 1, 1993, the Laurel County jury found Foley guilty of the murders of the Vaughn brothers.

On September 3, 1993, the jury unanimously recommended Foley to receive two death sentences for murdering the Vaughn brothers.

On September 22, 1993, Foley was formally sentenced to death via the electric chair for the double murder.

=== Second trial ===
On November 8, 1991, Foley's quadruple murder charges were brought forward for review by a separate grand jury. On December 20, 1991, a Laurel County grand jury indicted Foley for the murders of all four victims from the 1989 mass murder case. On September 28, 1993, a judge granted Foley's request to move his trial venue from Laurel County to another county.

On April 5, 1994, Foley officially stood trial for murder a second time, this time in relation to the 1989 quadruple killings, and jury selection was carried out on the same day.

On April 8, 1994, Foley was found guilty of all four counts of murder by the jury.

On April 11, 1994, the jury unanimously voted to impose the death penalty for the quadruple murder.

On April 27, 1994, Foley was handed an additional four death sentences by the trial court for the 1989 case.

== Appeals ==
On May 16, 1996, Robert Foley filed his first appeal against the two death sentences for the 1991 murder of the Vaughn brothers, requesting the Kentucky Supreme Court to overturn both sentences in favour of a new trial.

On November 21, 1996, the Kentucky Supreme Court rejected Foley's appeal against his two death sentences for the Vaughn brothers case.

On April 24, 1997, the Kentucky Supreme Court upheld Foley's four death sentences for the 1989 case and rejected his appeal. The court rejected Foley's argument that it was manifestly excessive for him to be given four death sentences for the 1989 mass murder, on account that there were precedent cases where certain convicts received more than one death sentence for multiple murders.

On March 21, 1998, the U.S. Supreme Court dismissed Foley's appeal for the 1989 murder case.

On March 23, 2000, the Kentucky Supreme Court ruled that Foley received adequate legal counsel in his trial for the 1991 Vaughn case.

On November 22, 2000, Foley's appeal in the 1989 case was again rejected by the Kentucky Supreme Court.

On December 12, 2000, the U.S. Supreme Court dismissed Foley's appeal for the 1991 Vaughn case.

On March 22, 2010, the Kentucky Supreme Court denied Foley's appeal for the 1991 homicides.

On March 20, 2014, Foley's appeal was rejected by the Kentucky Supreme Court.

On June 11, 2015, the Kentucky Supreme Court dismissed the appeal from both Foley and another convicted murderer Ralph Baze against the Kentucky governor Steve Beshear, Kentucky Department of Corrections and Kentucky Parole Board regarding the clemency petitions and policies.

On August 26, 2016, Foley's appeal was turned down by the 6th Circuit Court of Appeals.

On February 16, 2017, the Kentucky Supreme Court denied Foley's post-conviction petition.

== Other developments ==
In May 1992, before he stood trial for the 1989 and 1991 murders, Robert Foley was charged with assaulting a fellow prisoner while detained at the Madison County Detention Center. The victim was Owen Ray Gadd, who was charged with the sodomy and rape of a seven-year-old girl.

In January 1993, the bereaved family of the Vaughn brothers filed a federal lawsuit suing the FBI for negligient supervision of Foley, which resulted in the murders of the Vaughn brothers. In July 1996, a federal district court rejected the lawsuit and found that the FBI played no role in the double murder, and there was no causal connection between the case and the government or organization.

Sometime while on death row, Foley faced the possibility of a seventh murder charge, because in a previous 1988 assault case, the victim, Robert Tucker, was severely assaulted and left incapacitated by Foley on September 8, 1988, and Tucker died on an unknown date years after the incident from his injuries. In April 1995, the prosecution decided to dismiss the case and not proceed with trying Foley for Tucker's death on account of his six death sentences for the 1989 and 1991 homicides.

In April 2015, Foley lost a lawsuit requesting the state to pay for a hip replacement surgery on his behalf. In his filing, Foley claimed that he suffered from arthritis pain on his hip since 2008 and that the $50,000 operation was necessary, but corrections department could not allow him to receive the surgery since it was not a medical necessity and they could not find a hospital to operate on Foley (primarily due to security concerns raised by the hospital representatives pertaining to Foley's death row status). The district court sided with the state and rejected the lawsuit. Foley also claimed that the prison refused to let him use a wheelchair but the court found that Foley had not been withheld from treatment since he was offered a walker and given pain medication and a steroid injection.

In December 2018, during an interview, the daughter of Rodney Vaughn (one of Foley's victims) expressed that she still waited for Foley to be executed and hoped for the Commonwealth of Kentucky to resume executions, emphasizing on the pain and sadness of losing her father and uncle Lynn Vaughn to the murders back in 1991. In August 2019, Rodney's daughter reaffirmed her commitment and wish to see Foley get executed.

A 2024 report showed that Foley was one of 25 inmates listed on Kentucky's death row.

As of 2026, Foley remains incarcerated at the Kentucky State Penitentiary.

== See also ==
- Capital punishment in Kentucky
- List of serial killers in the United States
- List of death row inmates in the United States § Kentucky
