= Foli =

Foli is both a surname and a given name. Notable people with the name include:

- Allan James Foley (1837–1899), known as "Signor Foli", Irish bass opera singer
- Tim Foli (born 1950), American former professional baseball player
- Foli Adade (born 1991), Ghanaian professional footballer

== See also ==
- Foley (disambiguation)
- Foly
- Folie (disambiguation)
