= Stephan A. Foley House =

Historic house in Illinois, United States

- U.S. National Register of Historic Places
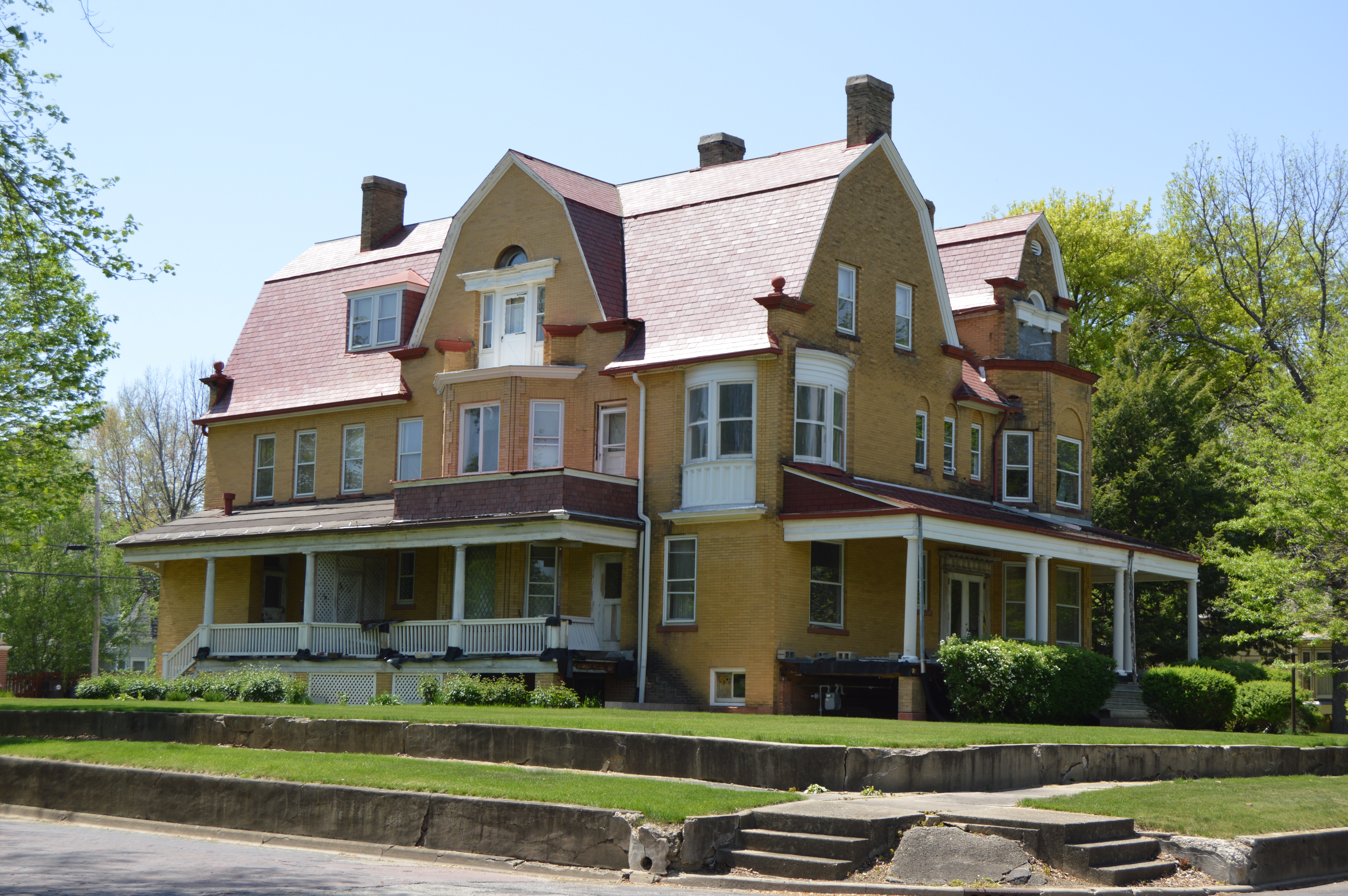
- View from east

- Location within Illinois Location within the United States
- Location: 427 Tremont St., Lincoln, Illinois
- Coordinates: 40°9′8″N 89°21′53″W
- Area: 0.6 acres (0.24 ha)
- Built: 1898
- Architect: Otis, W. A.
- Architectural style: Colonial Revival, Queen Anne
- NRHP reference No.: 84001141
- Added to NRHP: May 3, 1984

The Stephan A. Foley House is a historic house located at 427 Tremont St. in Lincoln, Illinois. The house was built in 1898 for Stephan A. Foley, a county judge and prominent local philanthropist. Architect W. A. Otis likely designed the house, a Queen Anne home with Colonial Revival details. The house's irregular shape and its porches and bays are typical of Queen Anne buildings. Colonial Revival elements of the house include its gambrel roofs, Palladian windows, swans neck pediments, and quoins on the corners.

The house was added to the National Register of Historic Places on May 3, 1984.
