= Sara Rowsey Foley =

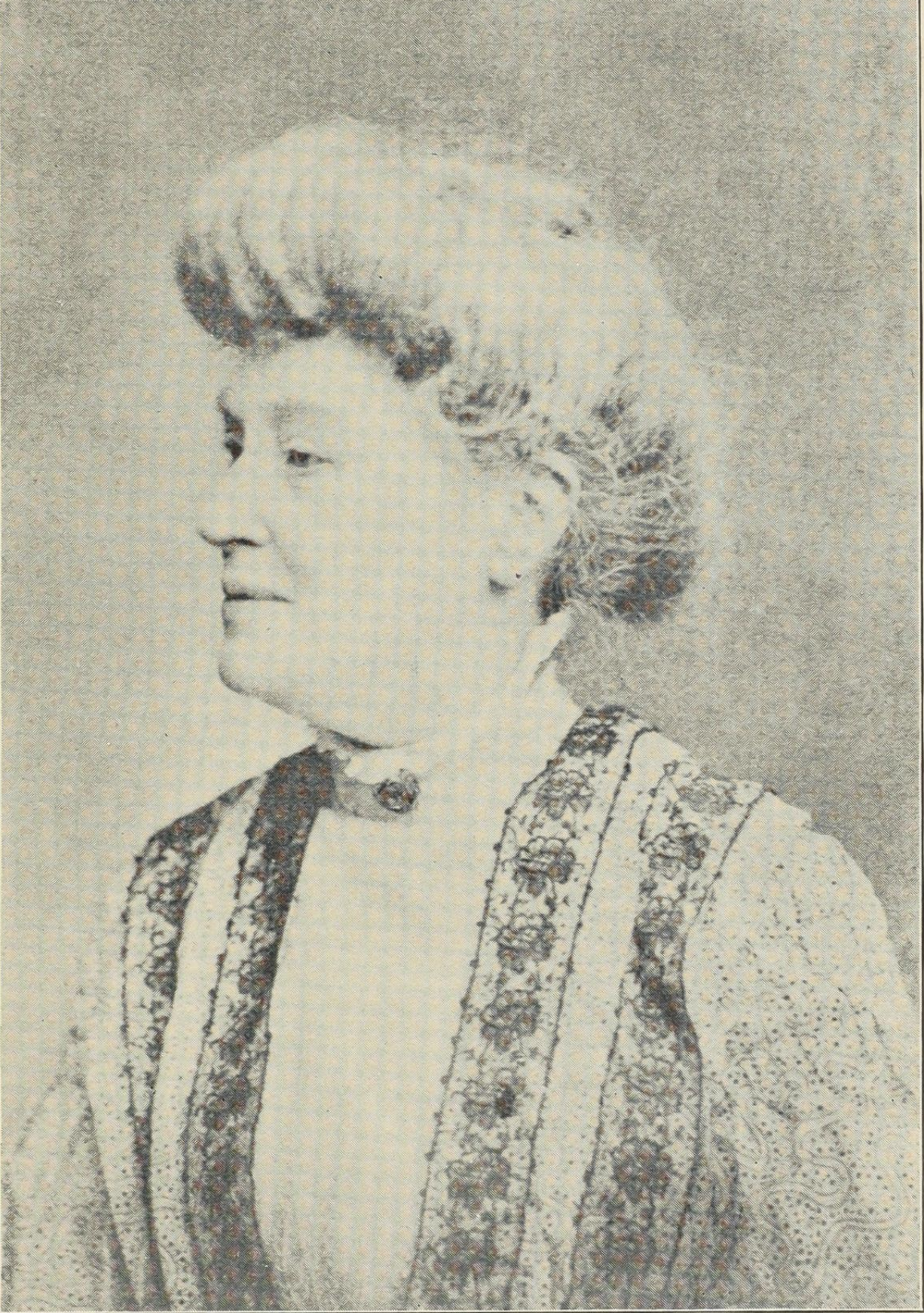
- Foley in 1924
- Born: Sara Rowsey; November 25, 1840 Cincinnati, Ohio, U.S.
- Died: October 22, 1925 (aged 84) Toledo, Ohio, U.S.
- Resting place: Calvary Cemetery
- Occupation: educator; journalist; biographer; clubwoman
- Genre: biographies
- Notable works: Toledo Women Writers of Yesterday
- Spouse: Cornelius Foley (d. 1900)
- Children: 1

Signature
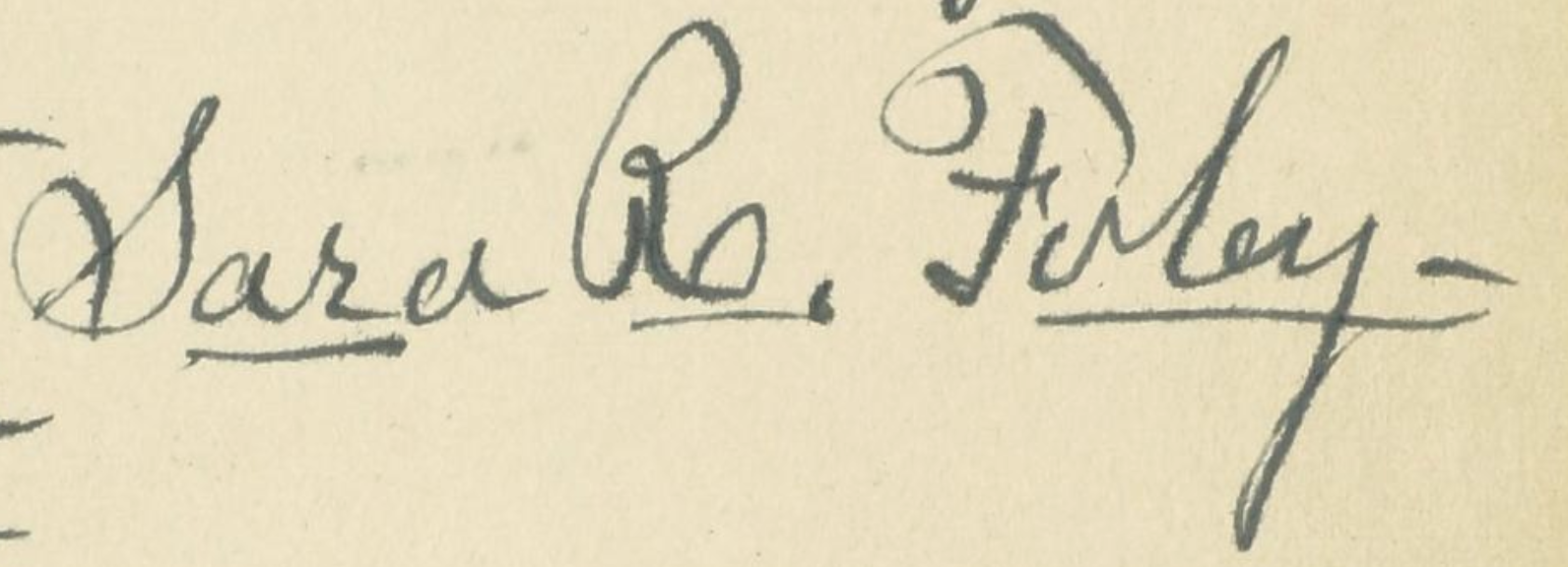

Sara Rowsey Foley (November 25, 1840 - October 22, 1925) was an American teacher, journalist, biographer and clubwoman. She was the first newspaper woman in Toledo, Ohio.

== Early life ==
Sara Rowsey was born in Cincinnati, Ohio, November 25, 1840. Her father was Captain C. A. Rowsey. The family came to Toledo, Ohio in 1852.

== Career ==
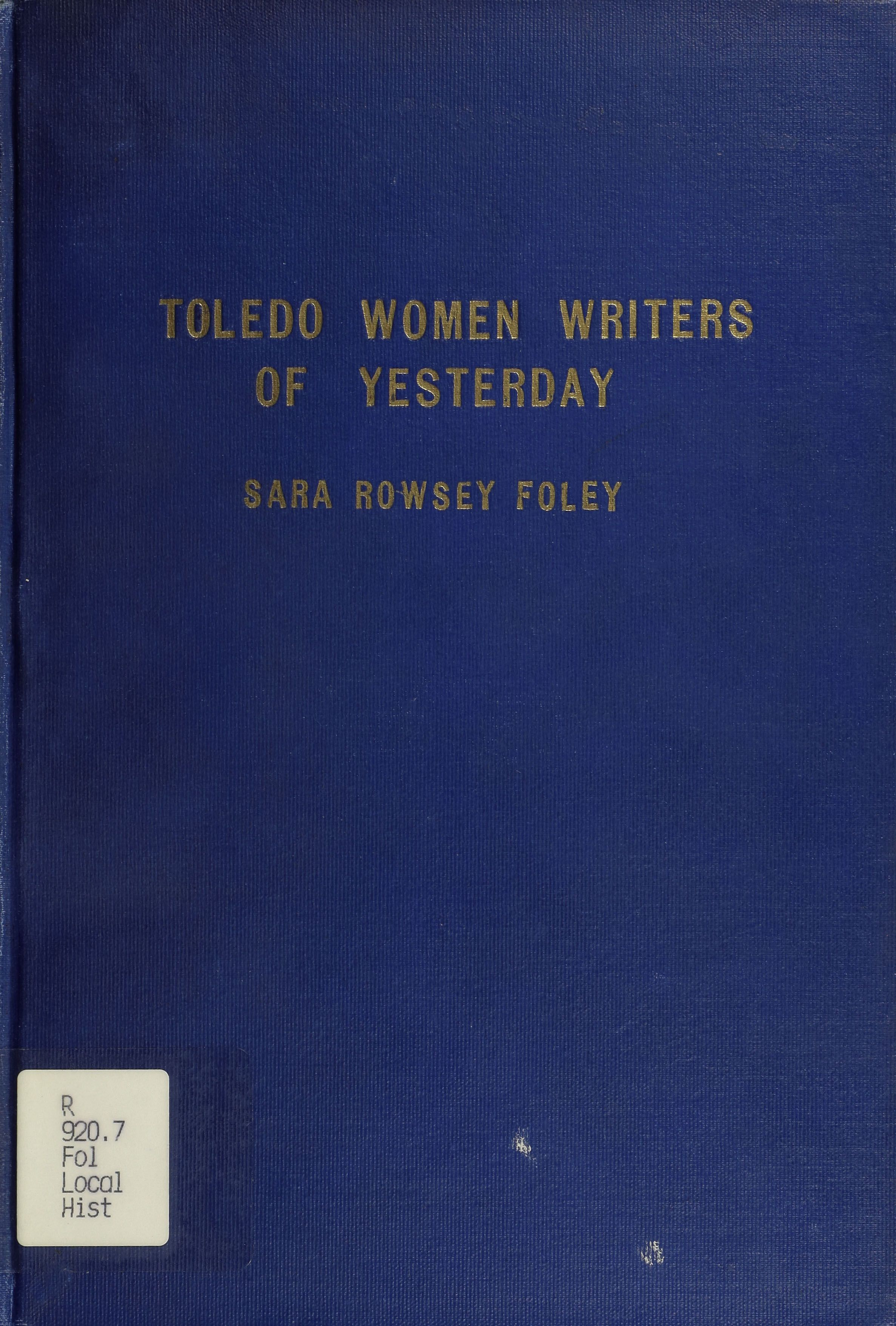
Toledo Women Writers of Yesterday

Foley's early career was as a school teacher. She taught for at least fifteen years in Toledo's Lagrange Street School.

She became the first newspaper woman in Toledo, serving as a member of the advertising and editorial staff of the Toledo Commercial. She published in other periodicals, including Catholic Record.

She published a book of Toledo reminiscences in 1923. In January 1925, she published Women Writers of Yesterday, which records the part that Toledo women played in the development of local and state newspapers. More than thirty writers are named, among them women who served as reporters, column conductors, society and club editors, dramatic critics, book reviewers, as well as Sunday and associate editors. The women were on the staff of The Blade, Bee, Commercial, Courier-Journal, and other publications. On the list also are a number of women who developed their writing in other fields, composing club papers, compiling library catalogues, writing in defense of women's rights.

A clubwoman, she served as president of the Dante club. She was also an organizer and the first vice president of the Toledo Women's Writers club.

== Personal life ==
Her husband, Cornelius, died in July 1900. The couple had a daughter, Julia.

In 1908, Foley and her daughter visited Los Angeles, California for three months.

Sara Rowsey Foley died in Toledo on October 22, 1925 and was interred in Calvary Cemetery.

== Selected works ==
- Toledo Women Writers of Yesterday, 1925 (text)
