= Kevin Foley =

Kevin Foley may refer to:

- Kevin Foley (drummer) (born 1988), drummer
- Kevin Foley (footballer, born 1984), Republic of Ireland association footballer
- Kevin Foley (Gaelic footballer) (born 1960), Irish Gaelic footballer playing for County Meath
- Kevin Foley (golfer) (born 1987), American golfer
- Kevin Foley (hurler), Irish hurler
- Kevin Foley (South Australian politician) (born 1960), former South Australian politician
- Kevin Foley (Victorian politician) (born 1938), politician and academic
