= Charles F. Foley =

American politician

Charles F. Foley (c. 1868 – June 7, 1932) was an American lawyer and politician. He served in the state legislature, was a regent of the University of Kansas, and was a member of the Kansas public utilities commission.

== Early life and education ==
Foley was born and educated in Canada, and later in Boston, Massachusetts.

In 1880, at age twenty, he moved to Kansas. He was a principal of the grade schools in Rosedale and Armourdale, Kansas.

Through his work as a school teacher in the eastern section of the state, earned enough to defray his expenses at the University of Kansas. He graduated from the law department in 1884, then continued teaching two more years.

== Career ==
Foley began the practice of law at Lyons, Kansas. Additionally, he served as county attorney for three terms.

Foley was a Democrat, a member of the Masonic order and the Knights of Pythias. His public record began with his election to the State Legislature in 1896, and by re-election he served during the session of 1897-98-99.

In 1909, Governor Stubbs appointed him regent of the University of Kansas, and four years later he was reappointed by Governor Hodges and served until July, 1913. On December 8, 1913, he was appointed by Governor Hodges a member of the Public Utilities Commission, and served as its chairman until April 1, 1915. In February, 1915, he had been reappointed by Governor Capper, and on the expiration of his short term in January, 1916, Governor Capper reappointed him for the full term of three years.

== Personal life and death ==
Foley was married and had a daughter. He lived in Kansas City, Kansas, and moved to California in 1920. He died in Los Angeles on June 7, 1932.
