= Death of Henry Foley =

Killing in custody by police officer in Merseyside

Henry Foley
- Died: 12 February 1985; Southport, Merseyside, England
- Occupation: Bus driver (retired)
- Known for: Death caused by police action

Henry Foley (died 12 February 1985) was a 67-year-old retired bus driver from Southport, Merseyside, in England, who died from injuries inflicted by a police officer while in custody. Sergeant Alwyn Sawyer of Merseyside Police, his assailant, was convicted of manslaughter. It was the only case of a British police officer being convicted of killing someone in custody prior to PC Benjamin Monk's conviction for the manslaughter of Dalian Atkinson in 2021.

== Arrest and death ==
On 11 February 1985 Foley, a widower from Pitt Street, Southport, had been playing dominoes and drinking at Southport Railway Club with his long-standing friend Frederick Rigby. Describing Foley's state on leaving, Rigby said: "He was merry. It was not my view that he was drunk." Outside the club Foley was arrested for being drunk and incapable, arriving at the town's police station shortly after midnight. Police intended to release Foley before 6am on 12 February but because he refused to mop up some urine in his cell it was decided to detain him further.

At 7am Sergeant Ivor Richardson took over the duty of custody officer. At approximately 7.40 am he went to release Foley but was allegedly subjected to a sustained attack. It was claimed that Foley hit him in the face and he fell over, banging his head, with Foley continuing to punch and kick him. Sergeant Richardson crawled into the corridor shouting for help. Other officers rushed to the scene and overpowered Foley, cuffed his hands behind his back and returned him to the cell. Richardson was taken to hospital with facial injuries, and his duties were taken by Sergeant Alwyn Sawyer. The 45-year-old Sawyer had served in Southport police since 1962, in which time he had received a commendation for plainclothes work, as well as a Royal Humane Society medal for saving five men from a fire in 1978.

Sergeant Sawyer went into the cell where Foley still had his hands cuffed behind his back. Sawyer's repeated stamping or kicking of Foley's abdomen damaged Foley's spleen causing a complete rupture of the small bowel. and total detachment of his left kidney. Foley also sustained bruising to the head and chest. Later in the morning two detectives saw Foley complaining of stomach pain and asking for a doctor. A police surgeon examined him around midday and sent him to hospital where he died at 7.45 pm from a heart attack as a result of his injuries.

Sawyer visited Sergeant Ivor Richardson in hospital, telling his colleague, "you are well covered and well out of it." Two days later Richardson spoke to Sawyer on the phone, asking "did you give Foley a good wellying?" Sawyer replied: "You have nothing to worry about."

== Alwyn Sawyer's trial ==
Cumbria police were brought in to investigate. Detective Chief Superintendent Richard Stainton interviewed Sawyer 12 days after Foley died. Asked if he had ever punched, kicked, stood on, stamped on or kneeled on Foley in any way, Sawyer said, 'no, to each part of the question - I didn't go into the cell'. He offered no alternative explanation for how Foley sustained the injuries.

Foley's shirt had a footprint on the abdomen. Forensic examination showed the only one at the police station it could match was Alwyn Sawyer's left boot. He was charged with murder.

In February 1986, Sawyer stood trial at Manchester Crown Court. He pleaded not guilty, but did not take the witness box to give any explanation of what happened to Foley, nor his part in it. The prosecution suggested that assault was retribution for attacking Richardson, who had been celebrating his 25th anniversary as a police officer on the day Foley assaulted him.

On 18 February 1986 the jury took just over four hours to reach a verdict of not guilty of murder but guilty of manslaughter. Mr Justice MacPherson sentenced him to seven years saying: "This is, of course, a tragic day for you, but this was a gross act."

Henry Foley's daughter Collette Major praised the investigating officers from Cumbria police. Citing family members who were police officers, she said: "The enquiry was the sort of policing you are brought up to believe in when you are a little child," and said she felt that Sawyer's sentence was reasonable.
