= Foly =

Foly is a surname. Notable people with the surname include:

- Adriaen Foly (1664–1701), Danish painter
- Liane Foly (born 1962), French blues and jazz singer, actress, presenter, and impressionist

== See also ==
- Foley (surname)
- Foli, given name and surname
