= Cornelia MacIntyre Foley =

American painter (1909–2010)

- Self portrait, 1934
- Born: Cornelia MacIntyre; January 31, 1909; Honolulu, Territory of Hawaii (now Hawaii)
- Died: January 18, 2010 (aged 100); Severna Park, Maryland, U.S.
- Education: Huc-Mazelet Luquiens, Madge Tennent, Henry Tonks
- Known for: Painting, printmaking, sculpture
- Movement: Hawaiian modernism
- Spouse: Paul Foley

Cornelia MacIntyre Foley (1909–2010), was a Hawaiian-born American painter, and illustrator. Foley is best known for her voluptuous paintings of Hawaiian women, such as Hawaiian Woman in White Holoku from 1937.

== Early life and education ==
Cornelia MacIntyre was born on January 31, 1909, in Honolulu, Territory of Hawaii (now Hawaii, U.S.). Her great grandfather was Edwin O. Hall, a printmaker who sailed to the islands with a group of New England missionaries.

She began her art training under the first art instructor at the University of Hawaii, Huc-Mazelet Luquiens (1881–1961). Foley continued her art education at the University of Washington, and spent two years in London at the Slade School of Art as a pupil of Henry Tonks (1862–1937). From London, she returned to Hawaii, where she studied with Madge Tennent from 1934 to 1937.

== Career ==
Hawaiian Woman in White Holoku (1937) by Cornelia MacIntyre Foley, Honolulu Museum of Art

Varhey Circle Fountain (1934), cast concrete fountain by Henry H. Rempel and Cornelia MacIntyre Foley, University of Hawaii at Manoa

Subsequently, she married Lieutenant Paul Foley (who became a Rear Admiral in the United States Navy). During 1937–1941, the couple lived in Long Beach, California; in Seattle, Washington in 1941–1942; and followed by Newport, Rhode Island.

Foley died January 18, 2010, in Severna Park, Maryland.

Major paintings by Foley are held by the Honolulu Museum of Art and the Nelson-Atkins Museum of Art in Kansas City, Missouri.

A cast concrete outdoor fountain, known as the Varhey Circle Fountain, which she created with Henry H. Rempel, is on the campus of the University of Hawaii at Manoa.
