= Mick Foley (footballer) =

Irish footballer

Personal information
- Full name: Michael Foley
- Date of birth: 1892
- Place of birth: Dublin, Ireland
- Height: 5 ft 7 in (1.70 m)
- Position: Half back

Senior career*
| Years | Team | Apps | (Gls) |
| –1910 | Shelbourne | | |
| 1910–1919 | Leeds City | 127 | (6) |
| 1919–???? | Shelbourne | | |

International career
| 1926 | Ireland | 1 | (0) |
| | League of Ireland XI | 5 | |
- * Club domestic league appearances and goals

Mick Foley was an Ireland international footballer.

Foley began his senior career with Shelbourne in Dublin but then was one of three Shelbourne players recruited by Frank Scott-Walford to play for Leeds City before the 1910–11 season, the others being George Cunningham and Joe Enright.

After two seasons where he did regularly feature in the first team, Foley then broke into the left half position for the 1912/13 season and held down the place for two more seasons until World War I during which he returned to his native Dublin.

Mick was again part of the Leeds side on the resumption of league football in 1918/19. But the club were wound up in October 1919 and Mick returned to Ireland to rejoin Shelbourne where he was a member of the team that were founder members of the League of Ireland in 1921.

== International career ==
On 21 March 1926, Foley made his only appearance for Ireland when he captained the team in a 3–0 defeat to Italy in Turin.
