= Brian Foley (hymnist) =

English hymnist and priest

William Brian Foley (28 November 1919 – 11 October 2000) was a Roman Catholic priest and hymnwriter.

He was educated at St Mary's College, Crosby and Upholland, where he was ordained a priest in 1945.

He became the parish priest of Clayton Green, Chorley, Lancashire. Foley lamented the loss of plainsong and the traditional Roman Catholic style of worship after Vatican II. Fourteen hymns written by Foley are included in the 1971 New Catholic Hymnal.
