= Mick Foley (public servant) =

Australian public servant

Official Member of the House of Assembly
- In office 1968–1972

Personal details
- Born: 8 December 1923; Warwick, Australia
- Died: 3 March 1975 (aged 51); Sydney, Australia

Stanley Michael Foley (8 December 1923 – 3 March 1975) was an Australian public servant. He rose to become a District Commissioner in the Territory of Papua and New Guinea, also serving as an official member of the territory's House of Assembly.

== Biography ==
Foley was born in Warwick, Queensland in December 1923. He studied at the Australian School of Pacific Administration, before moving to New Guinea in December 1942, joining the Australian New Guinea Administrative Unit in March 1943. He was demobilised in May 1948 and became a patrol officer for the Department of District Services and Native Affairs, working in Gasmata, New Britain, Rabaul and Talasea. In 1955 he moved to Kainantu, where he was promoted to Assistant District Officer. In 1967 he was appointed District Commissioner of Chimbu District.

Following the 1968 elections he was appointed to the House of Assembly as one of the official members, serving in the legislature until 1972. In 1969 he transferred to become District Commissioner of Western Highlands.

He was appointed to a senior position in the Northern Territory, but suffered a heart attack in 1973 and resigned from the civil service before taking up the new role. He subsequently moved to Sydney, where he died in 1975. He was survived by his wife Pam and five children.
