= Bill Foley (photojournalist) =

American photojournalist

- Born: William Foley
- Education: Indiana University Bloomington
- Occupations: Photojournalist, lecturer and speaker
- Spouse: Cary Vaughan
- Awards: Pulitzer Prize for Spot News Photography (1983); International Press Freedom Award (1991)

William Foley is an American photojournalist whose work has been recognized by several national and international awards, including a Pulitzer Prize and International Press Freedom Awards. He has worked on assignment in 47 countries, with a particular focus on the Middle East, and currently lectures in fine arts (photography).

== Photojournalist career ==
Completing his studies at Indiana University Bloomington in 1978, Foley left Indiana and took a $99 one-way flight to Amsterdam, where he began to tour Europe. In London, he met photo editor Horst Faas, then the Associated Press (AP) photo chief for the Middle East and Europe. Faas sent Foley on assignment to Egypt, where he worked for the next several years, primarily covering the presidency of Anwar Sadat. Foley was present at the 6 October 1981 military parade in which Sadat was assassinated, and photographed him only moments before his death, calling the photograph "The Last Smile".

At Sabra and the Shatila refugee camp in Beirut, Lebanon in September 1982, Foley shot a "series of pictures of victims and survivors of the [Sabra and Shatila] massacre", for which he and AP won the 1983 Pulitzer Prize for Spot News Photography. He later described the scene he found upon entering the camp after the departure of the Christian militiamen who had been guarding its gates:

Nothing was moving. In a place where I had made many friends, and hundreds of photographs, it was many things, but never silent. Usually, kids were yelling and playing, women were talking, dogs were barking, cars horns were honking ... but, on this morning, all was quiet. I was surrounded by piles of what, at first glance, looked like garbage, but as my brain started to work, I realized it was piles of corpses. The smell of decay was everywhere, as many of those killed had been dead for over 24 hours, in the September heat.

From 1984 to 1990, he worked as a contract photographer for Time, covering stories including the Palestinian intifada, Operation Desert Shield, the Iran–Iraq War, and Nelson Mandela's first visit to New York City. He has also done photographic project for the New York-based Children's Aid Society and the UK-based Save the Children.

For his efforts to free Hezbollah hostage and Beirut AP colleague Terry A. Anderson, Foley received one of the first International Press Freedom Awards from the Committee to Protect Journalists in 1991, along with his wife Cary Vaughan.

== Academic career ==
He currently works as an Assistant Professor of Photography at Marian University in Indianapolis. He also taught for five years as an adjunct professor at New York University’s Tisch School of the Arts.
