= Paul Foley (admiral) =

United States Navy admiral (1908–1990)

Paul Foley Jr.
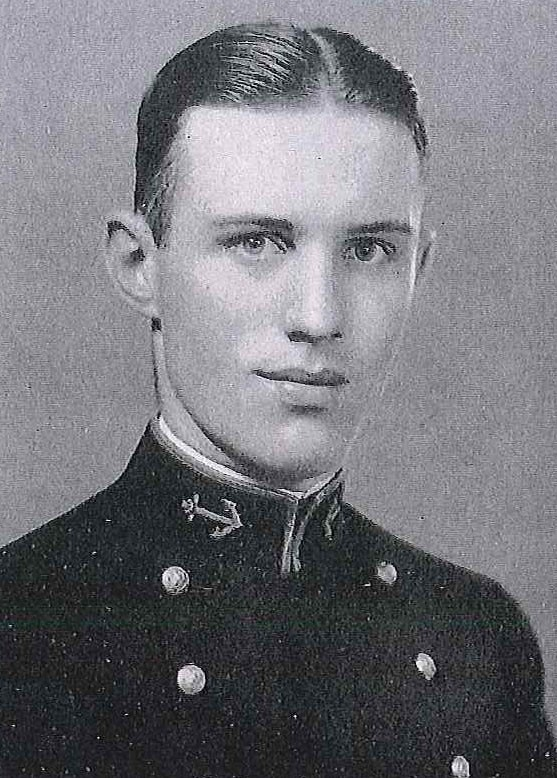
- Born: August 12, 1908
- Died: July 7, 1990 (aged 81)
- Burial place: Arlington National Cemetery
- Military career
- Allegiance: United States of America
- Branch: United States Navy
- Rank: Rear Admiral
- Conflicts: World War II; Aleutian Islands campaign

Paul Foley Jr. (August 12, 1908 – July 7, 1990) was a Rear Admiral in the United States Navy. About 1937, he married the artist Cornelia MacIntyre Foley (1909–2010). During World War II, while a commander commanding a PBY Catalina squadron in the Aleutians, Foley was involved in the recovery of the Akutan Zero. Upon his death in 1990 Foley was buried at Arlington National Cemetery.
