= Will Foley (footballer) =

Scottish footballer (born 1960)

Personal information
- Full name: William Foley
- Date of birth: 25 June 1960 (age 66)
- Place of birth: Bellshill, Scotland
- Position: Forward

Senior career*
Years	Team	Apps	(Gls)
- Merthyr Tydfil
- Pontllanfraith
1984–1985	Barry Town	17	(14)
1985–1986	Frickley Athletic		
1986	Swansea City	5	(2)
1986	Frickley Athletic		
1986	Cardiff City	7	(1)
1986–1987	Frickley Athletic		
1987–1988	Brecon Corries		
1988–1989	Newport County		
- * Club domestic league appearances and goals

William Foley (born 25 June 1960) is a Scottish former professional footballer who played as a forward.

== Career ==
Foley had played for several non-league sides, including Merthyr Tydfil, Barry Town United. He joined Frickley Athletic in 1985 and helped the side reach the third round of the FA Cup for the only time in the club's history. His performances led to him being signed by a Football League side on non-contract terms in January 1986. He made his professional debut in a 4–1 defeat to Rotherham United and made four further appearances, scoring twice, before being released.

After briefly returning to his former side Frickley Athletic, he was offered a return to the Football League by Cardiff City on another non-contract deal in March 1986. The club suffered relegation at the end of the season and Foley was not retained. He returned to non-league football, later playing for several clubs including Newport County, Hereford United and Worcester City.
