= Jack Foley (sound effects artist) =

American sound effects developer (1891–1967)

- Born: Jack Donovan Foley; April 12, 1891; Yorkville, New York, U.S.
- Died: November 9, 1967 (aged 76); Los Angeles, California, U.S.
- Other name: Joe Hyde (pen name)
- Occupations: Sound effect artist ("Foley artist"), humorist

Jack Donovan Foley (April 12, 1891 – November 9, 1967) was an American sound effects artist who was the developer of many sound effect techniques used in filmmaking. He is credited with developing a unique method for performing sound effects live and in synchrony with the picture during a film's post-production. Accordingly, individuals engaged in this trade are called "Foley artists".

He worked on pictures such as Melody of Love (1928), Show Boat (1929), Dat Ol' Ribber, Dracula (1931), Operation Petticoat (1959), and Spartacus (1960). For his work in Hollywood, Foley received the Motion Picture Sound Editors' Golden Reel Award.

== Early life ==
Jack Foley was born on April 12, 1891, in Yorkville, New York, to Irish immigrants Margaret Donovan and Michael Foley. Foley was raised in the area of Coney Island. Foley's parents were separated as Margaret lived with her father and four sisters. When Foley was sixteen, Margaret married Michael Gilmartin, the son of Sligo immigrants. Foley's biological father worked at the docks and was a volunteer firefighter as well as a singer and songwriter for local pubs. Foley grew up with James Cagney, Arthur Murray, and Bert Lahr being among his classmates. Foley's first job was as a clerk at the New York docks. During this time, Foley married Beatrice Rehm. They married in secret, as Foley was Catholic and Rehm was Protestant.

== Career ==
In 1914, Foley and his wife moved to Bishop, California, as Foley disliked the New York weather. While in Bishop, during World War I, Foley worked for the American Defense Society guarding the Los Angeles water supply to ensure the water wasn't poisoned. He also worked at a Bishop hardware store. During this time, Foley became involved in the theatre and composed a few plays. He also wrote and drew comics for the local newspaper.

During the early 1920s, many farm owners began selling their land to the city of Los Angeles for water rights as the city was growing at a rapid pace. This led to a decrease in wages for many of the locals, particularly those who worked in stores. Being personally affected, Foley began contacting several people he knew in the film industry. Along with the town's storekeepers, Foley led a publicity campaign to bring the film industry to Bishop to help stimulate the local economy. This endeavor was a success for Foley as he then scouted locations for film productions. This also led to Foley eventually working for Universal in various capacities, from a stuntman to a silent movie director.

By the latter half of the 1920s, sound was introduced in films. Many production companies began looking to incorporate sound in their movies. Foley became involved with this new aspect in the film industry and worked with sound for movies such as The Phantom of the Opera (1925), The Jazz Singer (1927) and Tarzan the Tiger (1929), in which he voiced the first Tarzan yell. It wasn't until Show Boat (1929) when Foley's career took off as he helped create sound effects for the movie which led to the name Foley effects. After this movie, Foley solely focused on sound for his career in the film industry. Foley worked for close to thirty years incorporating Foley sounds in movies, such as Dracula (1931) and Spartacus (1960). He helped bring movies to life by recording everyday sounds, such as chewing, knocking on wood, and footsteps. Foley made sound a critical aspect of movie productions.

Foley won awards for his work, including the Golden Reel Award. The Motion Picture Sound Editors society honored Foley after his retirement in the early 1960s.

== Death ==
Jack Foley died on November 9, 1967, at the age of 76. Foley himself calculated that he had walked over 5,000 miles (8,000 km) making sounds for films, and his work and legacy are still remembered to this day.

== See also ==
- Foley (filmmaking)
