= Kenswick, Worcestershire =

Village in Worcestershire, England

Coordinates: 52.223133°N 2.306659°W

Kenswick
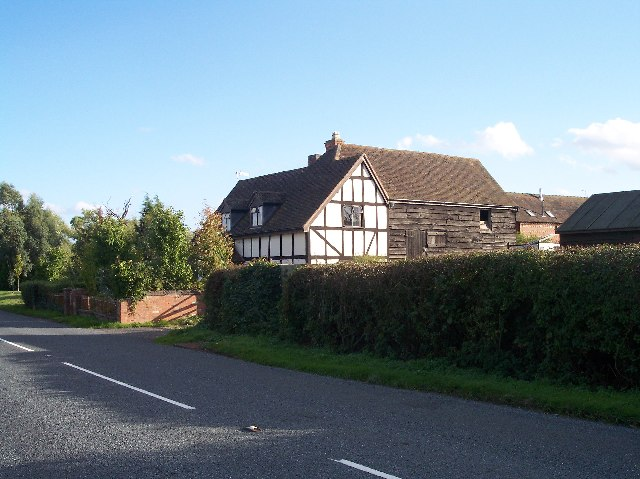
- Kenswick in 2005

- Location within Worcestershire
- Population: 78 (2021)
- OS grid reference: SO791583
- District: Malvern Hills
- Shire county: Worcestershire
- Region: West Midlands
- Country: England
- Sovereign state: United Kingdom
- Post town: WORCESTER
- Postcode district: WR6
- Police: West Mercia
- Fire: Hereford and Worcester
- Ambulance: West Midlands
- UK Parliament: West Worcestershire

Kenswick is a village and civil parish (with Wichenford) in the Malvern Hills District in the county of Worcestershire, England. It had a population of 78 at the 2021 census.

The name Kenswick derives from the Old English Cecswīc meaning 'Cec's trading settlement'.
