= Up Media =

Taiwanese media outlet

- Type: Online-only news
- Founder(s): Ma Yung-cheng
- Editor-in-chief: Shieh Chung-liang
- Founded: 15 July 2016; 9 years ago
- Language: Chinese
- Website: www.upmedia.mg

Up Media (Chinese: 上報) is a Taiwanese online news outlet established in 2016 that primarily focuses on in-depth reporting and interviews related to politics. It also covers esports news and hosts the Major Six tournament.

== History ==
In early 2016, former politician Ma Yung-cheng decided to leave politics and began discussions with his friends, journalists Wang Chien-chuang and Shieh Chung-liang, about the possibility of founding a media outlet together. On 15 July, Up Media was established with an investment ranging from NTD$150 to 200 million, funded by four entrepreneurs. ETtoday reported that the investors were primarily from the Pan-Green Coalition, while Want China Times noted that entrepreneur Chang Ya-li was one of the major shareholders, having invested over NTD$20 million in the startup. Wang Chien-chuang served as Up Media's managing director, and Shieh Chung-liang took on the role of chief editor. The outlet did not appoint a president, and Ma held the position of vice president. The founding editorial team consisted of 40 staff members, headquartered on Chang'an East Road in the Zhongshan District, Taipei.

Due to his connections with the Pan-Green Coalition, Ma stated in an interview with TVBS that he would not interfere in editorial decisions and would primarily oversee management and marketing affairs. Up Media focused on in-depth reporting and interviews, avoiding instant news coverage. Shieh explained that this decision was made to steer clear of clickbait and sensationalism, opting instead for a traditional journalism approach. He also brought some editorial staff from his previous employer The Storm Media to join Up Media.

In October 2016, Up Media began collaborating with video game companies and organized esports competitions, starting with the Third Major Six, a League of Legends tournament. A new column for gaming and esports news was launched alongside the political pieces, with Shieh crediting this new area as a significant source of revenue for the media outlet, and Up Media continued to host the Major Six annually. In August 2017, Up Media announced their collaboration with Project Syndicate, publishing translated articles from it. Before 2018, Hu Hong-ren became Up Media's president. In August 2020, Ma Yung-cheng resigned from Up Media.

In October 2018, an Up Media editorial commenting 2018 Taiwanese local elections won the News Commentary Award at the Excellent Journalism Awards. In October 2024, a commentary for William Lai's inauguration was nominated for another News Commentary Award. In addition, Wang Chien-chuang won the Outstanding Contribution Award in Journalism in October 2020.
