= Journalism and Media Studies Centre =

The Journalism and Media Studies Centre (JMSC) was founded in September 1999 at the University of Hong Kong. The centre is affiliated with the Faculty of Social Sciences in HKU. Educational programmes in JMSC include graduate and undergraduate courses, seminars, workshops and courses for news professionals at all levels of expertise.

== Academic programs ==
- Reporting and Writing Program
- Media Law Program
- China Program
- Business and Financial Journalism Program
- Documentary Filmmaking - Master of Journalism - Documentary Filmmaking Specialisation

== Faculty ==
- Ruby Yang Professor of Practice and Interim Director
- Uli Gaulke Lecturer
- Keith Richburg Director (2016 to 2023)
- Yuen-Ying Chan Professor and founding director (1999-2016)

== Hong Kong Documentary Initiative (2014 -2018) ==
Hong Kong Documentary Initiative was established by The University of Hong Kong's Journalism and Media Studies Centre in 2014 after the success of "My Voice, My Life" with major support from Lee Hysan Foundation (2014-2018). The advisors and co-convenors of the Hong Kong Documentary Initiative include Ruby Yang, Ying Chan and Nancy Tong. The Initiative aims to support and nurture local emerging filmmakers in making their mark in the documentary community with See Grants, Master Classes, Dialogue with Filmmakers. More than 40 filmmakers from US, Canada, Germany, France, Switzerland, Spain, Belgium, Czech Republic, Macedonia, Chile, Japan, Philippines, Mainland China, Taiwan and Hong Kong; over 50 events, 3,000 participants. Notable projects and visiting filmmakers from around the world:

- Seed Grants: 2015 – 2018, 3 rounds, 13 projects
- Master Classes: 8 Series, 20 Classes
  - Kirsten Johnson
  - Thomas Lennon & James Longley, Moderated by Ruby Yang (November 2016)
- Dialogue with Filmmakers: 34 Dialogues, 20 Interviews
  - Werner Herzong (March 2018 Event)

== China Media Project (2003-2018) ==
China Media Project was established by The University of Hong Kong's Journalism and Media Studies Centre in 2003.

=== Staff ===
- Ying Chan (陈婉莹)

Director of the Journalism and Media Studies Centre. Before 1998, Professor Ying Chan worked for 23 years as a reporter, editor and documentary filmmaker in New York City.

Professor Chan has also taught at the Columbia Graduate School of Journalism, Columbia University.

- Qian Gang

Director, China Media Project, Journalism and Media Studies Centre, The University of Hong Kong. Qian Gang is also the author of the book Great Earthquake of Tangshan.

- David Bandurski (班志远)

Bandurski is a China analyst and freelance investigative journalist at University of Hong Kong and was educated at the Northwestern University. David is responsible for managing the China Media Project website. David Bandurski is a regular contributor in Far Eastern Economic Review, The Wall Street Journal, Index on Censorship, the South China Morning Post and other publications.

- Cheng Jinfu (程金福)

=== Fellows ===
Mainland China's veteran journalists spend up to three months at the JMSC as Visiting Fellows.

Fellows from mainland China
Hu Shuli (胡舒立)	Shi Zhe (施喆)	Yang Jisheng (杨继绳)	He Xuefeng (何雪峰)	Yang Daming (杨大明)	Jin Liping (靳丽萍)
He Yanguang (贺延光)	Lu Ye (陆晔)	Sun Xupei (孙旭培)	Shi Zhengmao (石正茂)	Hu Yong (胡泳)	Lu Xinyu (呂新雨)
Tang Jianguang (唐建光)	Li Yaling (李亚玲)	Liu Chang (刘畅)	Wu Chongqing (吴重庆)	Pu Zhiqiang (浦志强)	Zhang Jianjing (张剑荆)

Liu Jianping (刘建平)	Sun Jie (孙杰)	Yan Lieshan (鄢烈山)	Zhu Xueqin (朱学勤)	Wang Keqin (王克勤)	Lu Yuegang (卢跃刚)
Zhang Jie (张洁)	Yang Haipeng (杨海鹏)	Zhai Minglei (翟明磊)	Zhong Cheng (钟诚)	Zhan Jiang (展江)	Zhao Shilong (赵世龙)

it is now based in the United States, with a "research hub" in Taiwan, according to the project's website.

== See also ==
- The University of Hong Kong
