= Keith Richburg =

American journalist

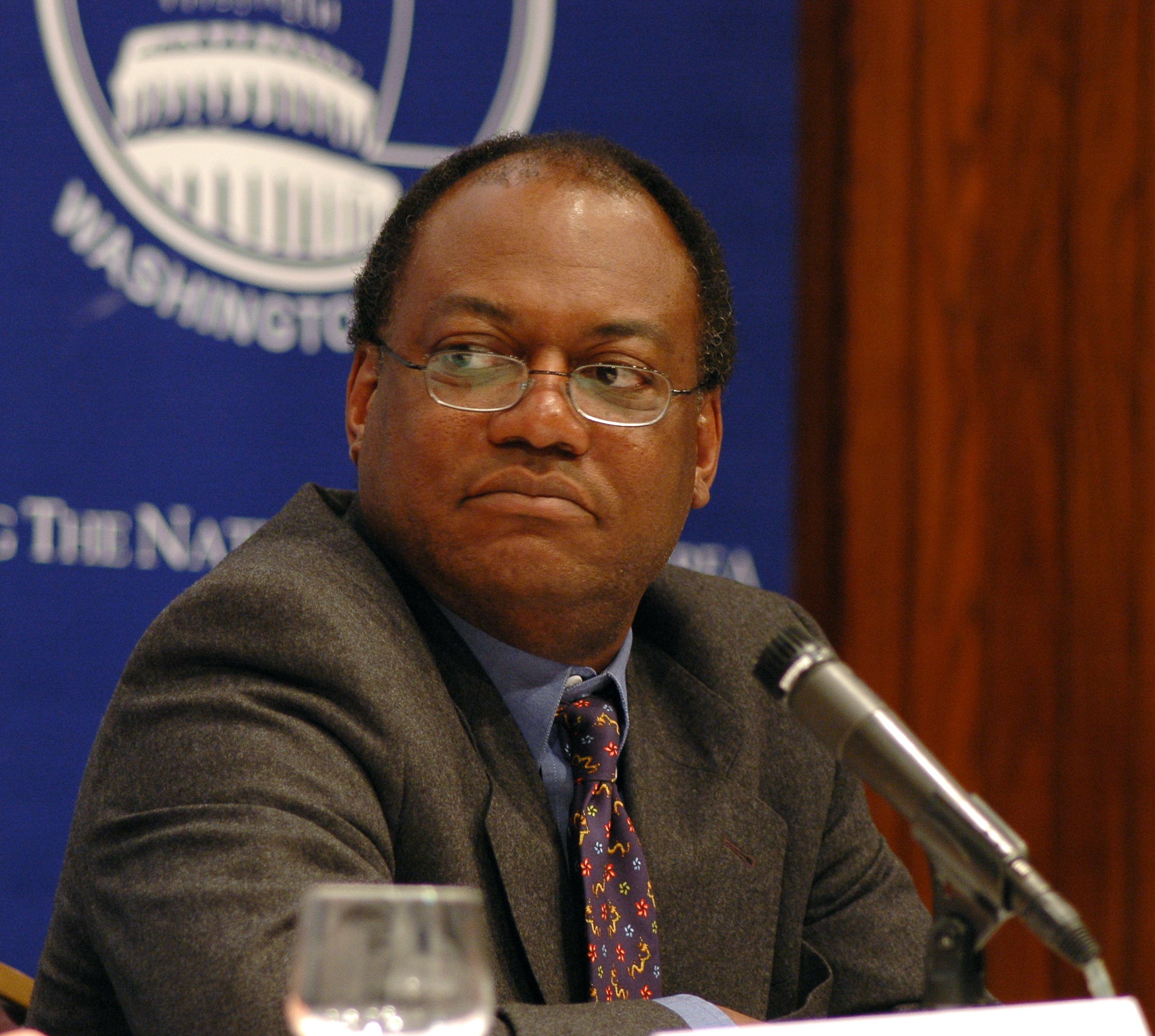
Keith Richburg in 2007

Keith Richburg is an American journalist and former foreign correspondent who spent more than 30 years working for The Washington Post. Currently serving as the Ferris Professor of Journalism at Princeton University, he was the director of the Journalism and Media Studies Centre of the University of Hong Kong from 2016 to 2023. From February 2021, he has been President of the Hong Kong Foreign Correspondents' Club until May 2023.

== Journalism ==
Keith Richburg is a native of Detroit, Michigan. He attended the University Liggett School, the University of Michigan (BA, 1980) and the London School of Economics (MSc. 1985).

External videos
- Booknotes interview with Richburg on Out of America: A Black Man Confronts Africa, April 6, 1997, C-SPAN
- Q&A interview with Richburg on his experiences as a foreign correspondent in Africa and China, February 24, 2013, C-SPAN

He served as a foreign correspondent for The Washington Post in Southeast Asia from 1986 until 1990; in Africa from 1991 through 1994; in Hong Kong from 1995 through 2000; and in Paris from 2000 until mid-2005. He was Foreign Editor of The Post, and was chief of the New York bureau of The Post from 2007 until 2010. He was a China correspondent for The Post based in Beijing and Shanghai from 2009 to 2012. He also covered the wars in Iraq and Afghanistan, riding a horse partway across the Hindu Kush, a journey he chronicled in The Post's Style section.

He is the author of Out of America, which detailed his experiences as a correspondent in Africa, during which he witnessed the Rwandan genocide, a civil war in Somalia, and a cholera epidemic in Democratic Republic of Congo. Richburg's book provoked controversy in the African American community due to its perceived criticism of Africans.

== After the Post ==
In spring 2013, he retired from the Washington Post and took up several teaching roles, including teaching international reporting at Princeton University and as a Resident Fellow at the Harvard Institute of Politics.

During this period he also served as editor-at-large and a visiting professor at the University of Hong Kong’s Journalism and Media Studies Centre, and in 2016 became its director, upon the retirement of founder and long-time director Yuen-Ying Chan.

== Foreign Correspondents' Club ==
On 13 February 2021, Richburg was unanimously (by the board) elected President of the Hong Kong Foreign Correspondents' Club. His selection came as media in Hong Kong were under great stress from the new National Security Law, including the closure a few months earlier of the city's leading newspaper, Apple Daily. On 29 May 2023, his tenure as the president of FCC was replaced by Lee Williamson.

== Books ==
- Richburg, Keith (1997). Out of America: A Black Man Confronts Africa. ISBN 0-465-00187-4.
