= Lu Ye =

Chinese soprano

Lu Ye (Chinese: 叶璐) is a Chinese-Canadian soprano and performing artist from Wenzhou, Zhejiang. She was taught by Warren Robinson and Tom Todoroff in the United States and Giorgio Albertazzi and Pupi Avati in Italy. She is the winner of the 2017 Opera Music Award.

After graduating from high school, she was admitted to the music major of Hangzhou Normal University. After graduating from the college, she worked as a soloist in Zhejiang song and dance troupe and Shanghai Opera House. She was also the host of a drama program in Zhejiang TV and participated CCTV's Zhengda Variety. Later, as a singer, she successively signed contracts with Hong Kong Record Company and Beijing Kangyi Audio Publishing Company and published three albums. Her album "Modern Times" was popular.

== Activities and honors ==
On 20 December 2013, at the Christmas concert held in Rome, the capital of Italy, the Chinese soprano Ye performed "The Virgin Mary". This was the first performance of Chinese singers at the Christmas concert in Rome which was one of the most important music events held in the area to celebrate Christmas.

On 12 April 2014, she was invited to sing the Canadian national anthem at the National Hockey League held in Montreal, Canada.

In October 2014, as a Chinese musician, Ye would participate the concert for 90-year anniversary of the birth of Maria Callas, the opera queen in New York.

In 2013, she was invited to participate in the opening ceremony of the Olympic Games in Rio de Janeiro, Brazil on the evening of 4 August and sing.

At the Brancaccio Palace in Rome, she received "The Lifetime Achievement Award" from Italian European Economic and Cultural Relations Scientist, recognizing her efforts and contributions to strengthen Italy's professional image in the international culture, society and economy.

In 2014, the European Institute for International Economic and Cultural Relations awarded her the "Lyric Music International Award". She was artist in the Asian region to receive this award.

In July 2016, she served as the promotion ambassador of Chinese products for "The Belt and Road". Before that, she was also the Italian cultural consultant of the European Contemporary Art Magazine, image ambassador of Wenzhou Chamber of Commerce in Quebec, Canada, the director of Wenzhou Announcement Diplomatic Association and so on.
