= Yuen-Ying Chan =

Hong Kong journalist and academic

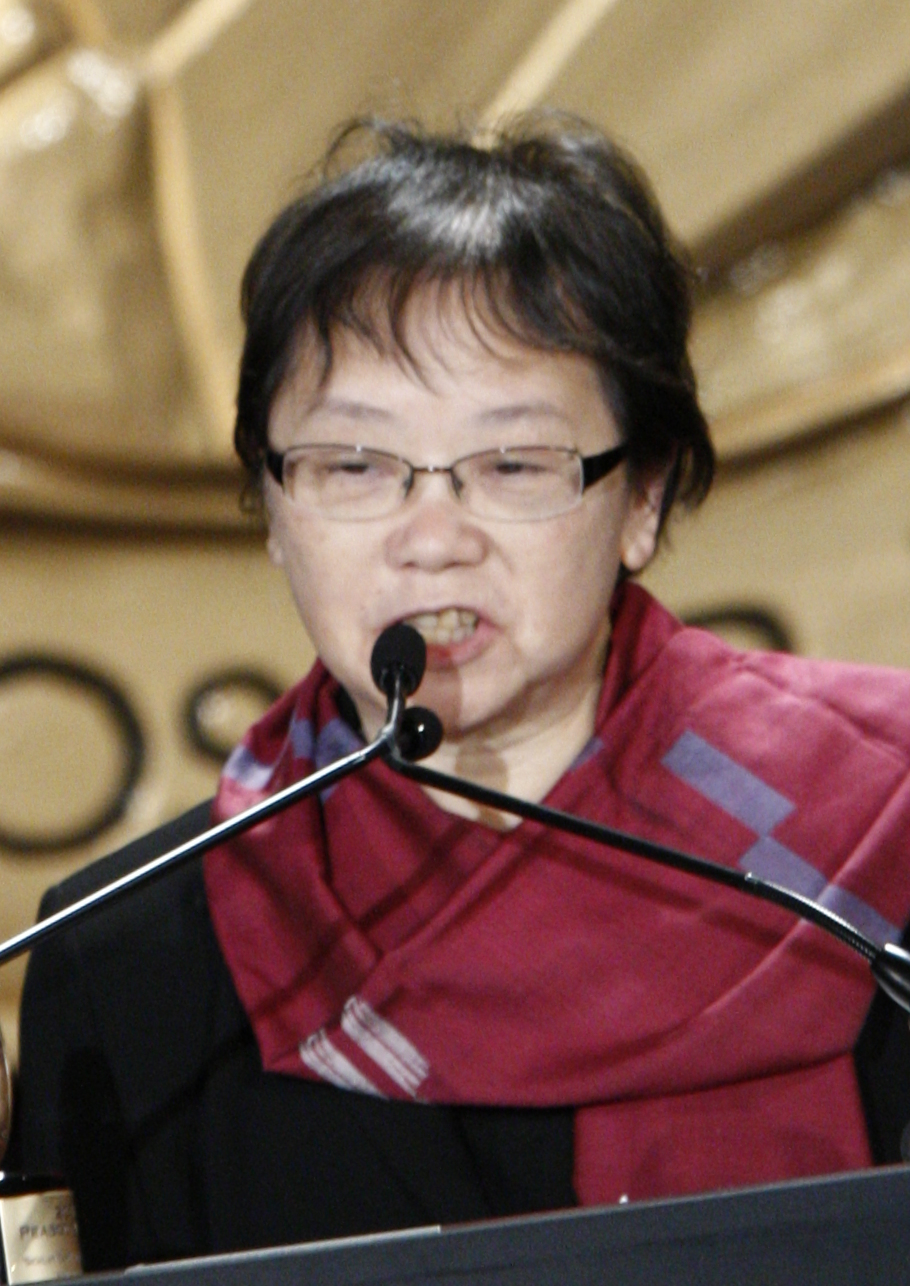
- Born: Hong Kong
- Education: University of Michigan
- Occupations: journalist, professor
- Awards: International Press Freedom Award (1997)

Yuen-Ying Chan (Chinese: 陳婉瑩; pinyin: Chén Wǎnyíng; Cantonese Yale: Chan^{4} Yun^{2}-ying^{4}, also known as Ying Chan) is a Hong Kong–based journalist and journalism academic whose investigative work and subsequent successful defence of a libel suit helped establish Taiwanese media freedom.

== Background and career overview ==
A Hong Kong native, Chan received a bachelor's degree in social sciences from the University of Hong Kong and a master's in journalism from the Chinese University of Hong Kong. Chan moved to the United States in 1972 to pursue a graduate degree at the University of Michigan. She later worked for the New York Daily News.

In 1999, Chan founded the Journalism and Media Studies Centre at the University of Hong Kong, with it offering both graduate and undergraduate degrees in journalism. She then led the centre as Director until 2016. She also established the Cheung Kong School of Journalism and Communication at Shantou University in Guangdong, China, and became its first dean.

In October 2016, she joined Hong Kong public policy think tank Civic Exchange as a Distinguished Fellow.

== Liu Tai-ying libel action ==
In 1996, Chan collaborated with Shieh Chung-liang, the Taiwan bureau chief of the Hong Kong–based magazine Yazhou Zhoukan to investigate possible Taiwanese contributions to US President Bill Clinton's re-election campaign. The pair wrote an article that appeared on 25 October reporting that Liu Tai-ying, the business manager of Taiwan's Kuomintang political party, had offered $15 million to Mark Middleton, an ex-Clinton White House aide. The article included a denial from Liu that he had offered the money. Liu went on to file a criminal libel suit against the pair on 7 November. Chen Chao-ping, a political consultant named as the source of the story, was added as a co-defendant. Liu also filed a civil suit for $15 million in damages.

Calling the trial "a test case for press freedom in Asia", The Committee to Protect Journalists filed an amicus brief on their behalf, as did ten major US media companies. The Kuomintang called a special meeting to endorse the libel suit and condemn Chan and Shieh. However, a Taiwanese district court ruled in the pair's favour on 22 April 1997. The ruling was "hailed as a landmark decision" for press freedom by media watchdog groups, in part because Judge Lee Wei-shen's decision acknowledged the constitutional right to a free press for the first time in Taiwanese judicial history.

== Other career activity ==
In 2006, she strongly criticised the search engine Google for censoring its Chinese service, calling it "a missed opportunity to help nurture free journalism in the country".

== Awards and honours ==
Chan's honours include a 1995 Nieman Fellowship at Harvard University and a George Polk Award for excellence in American journalism.

In November 1997, the Committee to Protect Journalists gave Chan and Shieh its International Press Freedom Award, "an annual recognition of courageous journalism". The award citation stated that "[Chan and Shieh's] courage sets an example in a region noted for both widespread self-censorship and government intervention in the functioning of the press."

In August 2013, the Asian American Journalists Association honoured Chan with a Lifetime Achievement Award, citing her media studies leadership roles at HKU and Shantou University. "Through journalism programs at both universities she is raising a new generation of questioning, curious and fair journalists right on the doorstep of mainland China," the award citation said in part.

Chan was a member of the Peabody Awards Board of Jurors from 2003 to 2009.
