= Lu Yuegang =

Chinese journalist and writer

Lu Yuegang (simplified Chinese: 卢跃刚), a Sichuan native in China, is a journalist and a writer of non-fiction. He was a reporter for the China Youth Daily for ten years, and was promoted to be the deputy director and later the principal reporter for the "news center" section, as well as the Daily's "Freezing Point" supplement. Meanwhile, he also serves as the Chairman of the China Association for the Study of Nonfiction. He has written several books, including The Oriental Carriage, a book about New Oriental, in 2002.
