= Shieh Chung-liang =

Taiwanese journalist

- Education: University of Minnesota
- Occupation: journalist
- Organization: Yazhou Zhoukan
- Known for: 1997 libel trial
- Awards: International Press Freedom Award (1997)

Shieh Chung-liang (Chinese: 謝忠良; pinyin: Xiè Zhōngliáng; Wade–Giles: Hsieh^{4} Chung^{1}-liang^{2}) is a Taiwanese journalist known for his role in a high-profile libel suit.

Shieh received a master's degree in journalism from the University of Minnesota.

In 1996, he was Taiwan bureau chief of the Hong Kong–based magazine Yazhou Zhoukan. Teaming with reporter Ying Chan, he co-wrote an article on 25 October reporting that Liu Tai-ying, the business manager of Taiwan's Kuomintang political party, had offered $15 million to US President Bill Clinton's re-election campaign. The article also printed a denial from Liu that he had offered the money. Liu went on to file a criminal libel suit against the pair on 7 November. Chen Chao-ping, a political consultant named as the source of the story, was added as a co-defendant. Liu also filed a civil suit for $15 million in damages. Yazhou Zhoukan defended its reporters and refused to settle the suit outside of court.

Calling the trial "a test case for press freedom in Asia", The Committee to Protect Journalists filed an amicus brief on the pair's behalf, as did ten major US media companies. The Kuomintang called a special meeting to endorse the libel suit and condemn Shieh and Chan. However, a Taiwanese district court ruled in the pair's favor on 22 April 1997. The ruling was "hailed as a landmark decision" for press freedom by media watchdog groups, in part because Judge Lee Wei-shen's decision acknowledged the constitutional right to a free press for the first time in Taiwanese judicial history.

In November 1997, The Committee to Protect Journalists gave Shieh and Chan its International Press Freedom Award, "an annual recognition of courageous journalism". The award citation stated that "[Shieh and Chan's] courage sets an example in a region noted for both widespread self-censorship and government intervention in the functioning of the press."
