= Excellent Journalism Award =

Taiwanese journalism award

- Native name: 卓越新聞獎
- Description: Outstanding journalists in Taiwan's print, radio, and television sectors during the year.
- Date: Annual
- Location: Taiwan
- Presented by: Excellent Journalism Award Foundation
- First award: 2002
- Website: feja.org.tw

The Excellent Journalism Award is an award established in 2002 by the Excellent Journalism Award Foundation, a non-governmental organization in Taiwan. It is awarded to journalists in print, radio, and television who have considered by the foundation to have demonstrated outstanding performance throughout the year.

== History ==
Taiwan's Excellent Media News Awards were established in the official Golden Bell Awards and Golden Tripod Awards, which are given by the Taiwanese government. However, it was considered inappropriate for the government to award prizes to news media. During his tenure, Su Cheng-ping, the former Director of the Government Information Office, decided to abolish the news awards of the Golden Bell Awards and Golden Tripod Awards, and called on the business community to donate to establish the Excellent News Awards Foundation, a non-governmental organization, in January 2002. The foundation is responsible for awarding annual news awards and setting a new benchmark for news ethics and journalistic professionalism.

On 20 April 2009, the 114th birthday of Zeng Xubai, the Zeng Xubai Journalism Award Foundation and the Excellent Journalism Award Foundation held a Memorandum of Understanding Signing Ceremony and Press Conference. The signing representatives were Chen Shenqing, Chairman of the Zeng Xubai Journalism Award Foundation, and Chen Shimin, Chairman of the Excellent Journalism Award Foundation. As a result of the meeting, the Zeng Xubai Journalism Award was merged into the Excellent Journalism Award, while Public Service Award and the Lifetime Achievement Award for Journalism were added. The 2020 Outstanding Journalism Awards established the "Radio and Internet (Audio) Category - Podcast News Program Award" for the first time, recognizing the resurgence of audio media. In addition to original programs, radio stations that have uploaded their existing radio programs to podcasts are also eligible to participate.

== List of past winners of the Outstanding Journalism Award ==
=== 2002 (First Session) ===
- Newspapers and News Agencies

Year	Nominations	Awards	Result
2002	"When Will Nuclear Safety Be Secure: The Pursuit of Corruption in the Fourth Nuclear Power Plant Project " (published in the China Times, June 5–21, 2008), by Li Zongyou, Li Chengwei, Wu Jiangquan, Guo Liangjie, etc.	Instant News Interview Award	Award
2002	"Medical Examination Network Project: Diagnosing Urban and Rural Medical Resources" ( published in Min Sheng Daily from December 25, 2009, to January 11, 2002), by Han Naizhen, Lin Xiumei, and 13 others.	Feature Report Award	Award
2002	"Beyond the Myth of the Opposition Between National Security and Freedom of Speech " (Published in China Times, March 21–27, 2008), by Ni Yanyuan	News Commentary Award	Award
2002	From lack	News Photography Award	

- Broadcast

Year	Nominations	Awards	Result
2002	The China Airlines plane crash ( broadcast by China Broadcasting Corporation on May 25, 1991), involved seven people including Peng Qunbi, Huang Yuejiao, Miao Yulun, Zeng Shenghao, and Feng Guoxiu.	Instant News Interview Award	Award
2002	The " Comprehensive Health Checkup" series of reports ( broadcast on Han Sheng Radio from August 28 to September 10, 2001), featuring Chu Ching-Chun, Chen Ya-Hung, Chang Chung-Shu, and Sun Jui-Lin.	Feature Report Award	Award
2002	Liang Mingda ( Yunlin Station, Cheng Sheng Broadcasting Corporation )	News anchor	Award

- TV

Year	Nominations	Awards	Result
2002	From lack	Instant News Interview Award	
2002	Behind the Miracle ( Public Television Service, June 27, 2008), Tsai Chung-lung and Lu Kai-sheng	Feature Report Award	Award
2002	Fang Nianhua ( TVBS News Channel, " News Frontline ")	News Anchor Award	Award

=== 2003 (Second Session) ===
- Print media

Year	Nominations	Awards	Result
2003	"The Beginning of the Century-Long Pandemic : Taiwan's First SARS Case" ( published in United Evening News on March 14–15, 2003), by Hung Shu-hui and Li Shu-ren	Instant News Interview Award	Award
2003	"A Vision to See the Sea" ( published in the United Daily News on May 25–28, 2003), by Weng Tai-sheng, Zhuo Ya-xiong, Han Shang-ping, Li Yan-fu, Huang Huang-quan, etc.	Feature Report Award	Award
2003	" Tomahawk cruise missiles strike Baghdad " ( Released by Central News Agency on March 20–22, 2013), Chen Zhengjie	International News Reporting Award	Award
2003	"A Close Call" ( published in United Daily News on April 12, 2012), by Chen Shih-yen	News Photography Award	Award
2003	"Moving Forward Undeterred: Financial Reform Can Be Adjusted But Not Stopped" ( Economic Daily News (Taiwan), August 24, 2002 - June 7, 2003), by Yu Zhiqin	News Commentary Award	Award

- Broadcast

Year	Nominations	Awards	Result
2003	"US-Iran War" ( broadcast on Police Radio on March 20, 2003), Fu Yu-chieh and 10 others	Instant News Interview Award	Award
2003	"Rebirth from the Ashes" ( Han Sheng Broadcasting Station, 92/9/1-9), Zhang Zhongshu, Sun Ruilin, Chen Yahong	Feature Report Award	Award
2003	Lai Chin-Chin ( Yilan Observation Notes, Yilan Station, China Broadcasting Corporation )	News Program Host Award	Award

- TV

Year	Nominations	Awards	Result
2003	The Beicheng Hospital injection error incident ( broadcast by China Television Company on 29–30, 2002), starring Hsu Chun- hsiang, Hsiao Tung-wen, Hsu Yu-jung, Weng Kan-huang, and Chang Fu-chin.	Instant News Interview Award	Award
2003	"The Price of War" ( broadcast on Da Ai TV from March 24 to 31, 2003), starring Yang Dongliang and Tong Xiangling.	Feature Report Award	Award
2003	"Forward to Israel and Palestine: Conflict and Peace " ( broadcast on Public Television from August 28 to September 11, 2008), Yu Jiazhang and Chen Lifeng	International News Reporting Award	Award
2003	Zhuang Kaiwen ( China Television Company's "Noon Hotline News")	News Anchor Award	Award

=== 2004 (Third Session) ===
- Print media

Year	Nominations	Awards	Result
2004	"Southeast Asian Bride Arrives in Taiwan" series of reports ( published in United Daily News on July 26–30, 2004), Liang Yu-fang	News Interview and Reporting Award	Award
2004	"In-depth look at the scene of the major earthquake in Iran " ( published in Tzu Chi Monthly from February 25 to April 25, 2004), by Hsu Hsi-man	International News Reporting Award	Award
2004	"Love of Life" ( published in China Times on July 18, 2004), by Wang Yuanmao	News Photography Award	Award
2004	From lack	News Commentary Award	

- Broadcast

Year	Nominations	Awards	Result
2004	"A Grand View of Scams: How Much Do You Know About Fraud ?" ( Broadcast by Cheng Sheng Broadcasting Company, August 16–18, 2004), by Fu Jingjun	News Interview and Reporting Award	Award
2004	1. "A New Restructuring of the Broadcasting Market : Cultural Taiwan Between the Island and the Mainland"; 2. " Cross-Strait Dilemmas and Vice President Lu's Political Philosophy" ( broadcast on Formosa Radio on August 4 and 6, 2004), by Chien Yu-yen	News Program Host Award	Award

- TV

Year	Nominations	Awards	Result
2004	"Taiwan's Water Shortage Panic" series of reports ( broadcast on Public Television from March 7 to 28, 2004), by Chang Hsiao-ying and Fan Kuang-chung.	News Interview and Reporting Award	Award
2004	Special report "Crying Afghanistan " (broadcast by Citizen Television Company from July 31 to August 21, 2004), Chen Chia-yi and Su Chi-fa	International News Reporting Award	Award
2004	From lack	News Anchor Award	

=== 2005 (4th) ===
- Print media

Year	Nominations	Awards	Result
2005	"The Fallow Revelation: The Failure and Way Out of Farmland Fallow Policies" ( published in China Times, July 10–17, 2005), by Ho Jung-jung and Kao Yu-chih.	News Interview and Reporting Award	Award
2005	The BRIC Countries series ( published in Business Weekly (Taiwan) 94/2/2 8-3/27), by Shen Yaohua, He Guifen, Wu Xiuchen, Guo Yiling, and Zheng Chenghuang.	International News Reporting Award	Award
2005	" Bridge Destroyed by Typhoon Haitang " ( Published in Apple Daily (Taiwan) on July 20, 2005), by Chang Wei-tung	News Photography Award	Award
2005	"Political turmoil continues, and hard times are inevitable" ( Published in the Commercial Times from October 23, 2004, to August 29, 2005), Kang Fuming	News Commentary Award	Award

- Broadcast

Year	Nominations	Awards	Result
2005	"Seeking a Kidney Across the Sea " series of reports ( broadcast on Han Sheng Radio Station 's "City News" from June 4 to July 2, 2004), by Gao Ruilin and Liu Xiulan	News Interview and Reporting Award	Award
2005	"The Era of Cohabitation: Finding Love in the Body" series of reports; 1. "The Dangers of Drug Addiction"; 2. "The Journey of Drug Rehabilitation" (broadcast on Kaohsiung Channel, Cheng Sheng Broadcasting Company, 2005/03/14-03/28), Hsieh Hui-ying	News Program Host Award	Award

- TV

Year	Nominations	Awards	Result
2005	" Fire Ant Showdown" (broadcast on Public Television from October 18 to 22, 2004), starring Chen Shu-jun, Ma Tai-xing, Peng Yao-zu, and Lin Jing-mei.	News Interview and Reporting Award	Award
2005	" Venice Adventure " Series: "How Taiwan Wins" (broadcast on FTV's " Opinion Forum " on June 25, 2005), starring Hsieh Hsiu-chi and Yu Wen-chang.	International News Reporting Award	Award
2005	From lack	News Anchor Award	

=== 2006 (5th) ===
- Print media

Year	Nominations	Awards	Result
2006	( Taiwan Journalists Association, * Witness Magazine *, 2006, 95.01) " Looking at the Disorderly Performance of Media Reporting Hijacking News from the Lin Minghua Case," by Chen Xianglan, Zheng Rongwen, and Li Qiongyue.	News Interview and Reporting Award	Award
2006	( China Times, July 17–21, 2006) Hong Kong Special Report, by Zhang Huiying, Chen Yishan, and Zheng Hanliang	International News Reporting Award	Award
2006	( United Daily News, April 13, 2006) "Unification vs. Independence," by Tseng Chi-sung	News Photography Award	Award
2006	( Commercial Times, September 6, 2005 – July 31, 2006) " Minimum Tax System and the Continued Momentum of Tax Reform," by Tseng Chu-wei	News Commentary Award	Award

- Broadcast

Year	Nominations	Awards	Result
2006	( Taiwan Fisheries Radio Station, Fisheries Agency, Council of Agriculture, Executive Yuan, August 31, 2005 - March 25, 2006) "Taiwanese Fishermen Under the Gun : A Horror Story in Somalia," Chen Yen-chen, Fan Cheng-yi, Wang Yung-lung	News Interview and Reporting Award	Award
2006	( Xinying Voice Radio Station, "Locals Care About Local Affairs," July 26, 2006 - August 22, 2006), Chen Zhichen	News Program Host Award	Award

- TV

Year	Nominations	Awards	Result
2006	( GTV's "Hourly News," May 22, 1995 – August 7, 2006) "The Mountain Legend of 0 and 1," starring Chu Yi-hsuan, Yang Yi-ting, Lin Che-hung, Chen Yu-hsiang, and Tsai Chin-lung.	News Interview and Reporting Award	Award
2006	( Public Television Service, Our Island, November 14–21, 1994) " German Ecological Series Report," by Zhang Daiping, Chen Jinbiao, and Lin Jiaying	International News Reporting Award	Award
2006	( TVBS-NEWS " Ten O'Clock Different "), Li Siduan	Daily News Broadcasting Award	Award

=== 2007 (6th) ===
- Print media

Year	Nominations	Awards	Result
2007	( Central News Agency, June 29, 2007) " An Investigation and Interview into Traditional Industries Amidst Chinese Dumping," by Hsu Ya-ching, Tsao Yu-fan, and Lee Ming-tsung.	News Interview and Reporting Award	Award
2007	( Business Weekly (Taiwan), March 12–18, 2007) "When the right people are right, things will go right," by Wang Wenjing, Yang Shaoqiang, and Zheng Chenghuang.	International News Reporting Award	Award
2007	( United Daily News, October 11, 2006) " Hide and Seek during the Double Ten National Day Celebration," by Chen Junji	News Photography Award	Award
2007	From lack	News Commentary Award	

- Broadcast

Year	Nominations	Awards	Result
2007	( National Education Radio, Hualien Station, April 2–5, 2007) " Suhua Highway Series Report," by Wu Caizhang	News Interview and Reporting Award	Award
2007	( Police Radio Kaohsiung Station, "Police Radio Variety Show," April 20, 2007 – May 21, 2007) " Death as a Gift : On Organ Donation," by Liu Jinghua and Yue Huiling	News Program Host Award	Award

- TV

Year	Nominations	Awards	Result
2007	(People's Television Company, May 5, 1996 – August 25, 1996) " The Truth About Environmental Impact Assessments " series of reports, Chen Chia-yi and Su Chi-fa	News Interview and Reporting Award	Award
2007	(Public Television Service, April 19, 1996 – May 15, 1996) "The 2007 French Presidential Election: French Tradition and Innovation," by Wang Huiwen, Chen Lifeng, and Wu Cuiqin	International News Reporting Award	Award
2007	Indigenous Evening News ( Indigenous Television, July 31, 1996 – August 18, 1996), Kolas Yotaka	Daily News Program Awards	Award

=== 2008 (7th) ===
- Print media

Year	Nominations	Awards	Result
2008	( Business Weekly (Taiwan) ) Yu Tzu-yen et al.	News Interview and Reporting Award	Award
2008	( Commercial Times ) Zeng Juwei	News Commentary Award	Award
2008	( Next Magazine ) Jiang Yongnian	News Photography Award	Award

- Broadcast

Year	Nominations	Awards	Result
2008	( Wangchunfeng Radio Station ) Yan Yushuang	News Interview and Reporting Award	Award
2008	(Chen Yanzhen, Taiwan Fisheries Radio Station, Fisheries Agency, Council of Agriculture, Executive Yuan)	News Program Host Award	Award

- TV

Year	Nominations	Awards	Result
2008	( TVBS ) Zhang Qiqiang	News Interview and Reporting Award	Award
2008	Lou Yajun and Luo Shengda (Public Television Station)	International News Reporting Award	Award
2008	PTS Evening News (Public Television Service), Su Chi-chen	Daily News Program Awards	Award

=== 2009 (8th) ===
- Print media

Year	Nominations	Awards	Result
2009	That's outrageous! / Zeng Xueren / United Daily News	News Photography Award	Award
2009	Towards a Greener Life / Hsiao Fu-yuan, Huang Yi-yun, Chiang Yi-chih, Chang Han-yi, Sun Hsiao-ping / CommonWealth Magazine	International News Reporting Award	Award
2009	The first anniversary of the faltering "second change of political parties" / Xia Zhen / China Times	News Commentary Award	Award
2009	The Secrets of the Chimneys: A Deep Dive into the High Cancer Rate at Mailiao Plant of Naphtha Cracker Factory / Liu Li-Jen, Lin Kuo-Hsien, Hsieh Wen-Hua, Wang Chang-Min / Liberty Times	Instant News Awards	Award
2009	"The Long Road to Long-Term Care" Special Report Series / Liang Yu-fang, Zheng Chao-yang, Zhang Yao-mao, Liu Hui-min, Wei Xin-xin, Cheng Jia-wen / United Daily News	Feature News Award	Award

- Broadcast

Year	Nominations	Awards	Result
2009	Special Report on the Partial Solar Eclipse in Taiwan / Zhao Yimin, Zhang Zirong, Liu Biwei, Liang Xuan, Zhong Yuanjun, Yu Guoyuan, Xu Junxiu, Zhang Han, Xu Mei, Song Ling, Xiao Wenxin, Fu Yujie, Wu Yang / Police Radio Station	Instant News Awards	Award
2009	A Group That Deserves to Die—Knocking on the Doors of Death Row Inmates Series / Zhan Wanru / Central Broadcasting Station	Feature News Award	Award

- TV

Year	Nominations	Awards	Result
2009	"The Vanishing Borders": Taiwanese Businesses Strive for First Place ( Brazil and Czechoslovakia ) / Li Tianyi, Liu Chuancheng, Xie Guoan, Wang Junqin / Sanlih E-Television	International News Reporting Award	Award
2009	Oil on the Edge / Chen Yizhong, Fan Wenqin, Gu Caiyan, Yang Qianwen, Zhang Beiqi, You Haoting, Zhang Jingling, Yan Ruisheng, Huang Jianguo, Lu Hongchang, Luo Shuming, Liao Guangbin, Banma Wangjia, Xu Kunshan, Zheng Guangda / TVBS	Instant News Awards	Award
2009	Major Events in Central Taiwan: Wetlands? Lost Land?! / Lin Chia-pei, Lin Huan-wen, Chang Cheng-feng / Ta-tun Cable TV	Feature News Award	Award
2009	Formosa News / Chang Chia-hsin / People's Television Company	Daily News Program Awards	Award

=== 2010 (9th) ===
- Print media

Year	Nominations	Awards	Result
2010	"The Fourth Phase of the CAS Project: The Storm Begins Here" / Zhu Shujuan	Instant News Awards	Award
2010	"Physical Power" / Yang Shaoqiang, Sun Xiuhui, He Xianhui, Lü Guozhen, Su Pengyuan, Wu Yixuan / Business Weekly	International News Reporting Award	Award
2010	"Bad Water" / Sun Zhongda, Wang Feihua, Guo Rixiao, Lu Taicheng, Zheng Jiewen, Xu Zhaochang, Zhang Haoan, Su Shengbin / Central News Agency	News Photography Award	Award
2010	"Fiscal Reform Requires Macroeconomic Strategy and Creativity" / Zeng Juwei / Commercial Times	News Commentary (Current Affairs Cartoon) Award	Award
2010	"Taiwan Sky Catastrophe" / Wang Wan-ru, Sun Hsiu-hui, Lai Ning-ning, Lu Kuo-chen, Chiu Pi-ling / Business Weekly	Feature News Award	Award

- Broadcast

Year	Nominations	Awards	Result
2010	Police Radio Evening News – “August 8th Flood Report” / Fu Yu-chieh, Chang Tzu-jung, Wu Ni-fang, Chang Tung-en, Wei Ching-ni, Cheng Wan-li, Chang Han, Lo Chia-hui, Hsu Hai-lun, Chung Yuan-chun, Huang Tien-hsi, Weng Chien-hui, Jen Yi-hsia, Liang Hsuan, Wu Ming-fen, Chung Yi-ju, Hsu Chun-hsiu, Lin Meng-ping, Sung Ling, Hsiao Wen-hsin, Chen Min-ling, Yu Kuo-yuan / Police Radio Station	Instant News Awards	Award
2010	"Let the Next Generation See the Indo-Pacific Hippodolite" Series Report / Wu Chunman, Yang Changshun / Cheng Sheng Broadcasting Company, Taichung Station	Feature News Award	Award

- TV

Year	Nominations	Awards	Result
2010	First-hand report on "A once-in-a-century earthquake in southern Taiwan! The Jiaxian section is severely shaken by the high-speed rail" / Reported by: Ke Fengyi, He Yixin, Li Baoren, Zhang Ziming, Lin Weilong, Lin Yibang, Gu Shouchang, Gu Shisheng, Ye Fengda, Li Zansheng, Fang Zhicheng, Xie Gujing, Zhang Zhewei, Wang Hualin, You Haoting, Yang Ziyi, Lin Jiaying, Huang Guojun, Zhang Jingling, Jiao Hanwen, Chen Shengwen, Huang Zhizhong, Chen Yingren, Lai Yuling, Lin Wanting / TVBS	Instant News Awards	Award
2010	"The Water Problem" series of reports / Chen Chia-hsun, Lin Yen-ju, Chu Shu-chuan, Chang Kuang-tsung, Chen Chung-feng, Yeh Chen-chung / Public Television	Feature News Award	Award
2010	"Forward to Haiti" / Zang Guohua, Zhong Yiting / CTiTV	International News Reporting Award	Award
2010	"Indigenous Language News e-Television" / Representative - Huang Zhiting / Indigenous Television Station	Daily News Broadcasting Award	Award

=== 2011 (10th) ===
- Print media

Year	Nominations	Awards	Result
2011	The White Rose Shocks – A Series of Reports on “Low Sentences for Child Sexual Assault Spark Public Outrage” / By Kuo Chih-yu, Chen An-chi, Chen Yu-kai, Lai Hsin-ying, Wang Yin-fang, Lin Yi-min, Chiu Chun-chi, and Liu Chang-sung / Apple Daily	Instant News Awards	Award
2011	"The Miracle of the Israeli Desert" / Yang Shaohua, Yang Zhuohan / Business Today	International News Reporting Award	Award
2011	"After the Century-Old Floods in Pakistan" / Hsiao Yao-hua / Tzu Chi Monthly	News Photography Award	Award
2011	"Government policy should be based on social justice" / Yu Guoqin / Commercial Times	News Commentary (Current Affairs Cartoon) Award	Award
2011	"60 Kilometers That Impact the World" / Lü Guozhen, Wan Niansheng / Business Weekly	Feature News Award	Award

- Broadcast

Year	Nominations	Awards	Result
2011	Police Radio Evening News – “Plasticizer Storm” / Jiang Guohao, Zhang Zirong, Huang Junwei, Wu Mingfen, Xu Mei, Lin Pinghao, Liu Biwei, Lin Mengping, Gao Shiqi, Lu Mingzong, Ren Yixia / Police Radio Station	Instant News Awards	Award
2011	"They Are Not for Sale—Tracing the Modern Slave Labor Incident in Taiwan" / Chan Wan-ju / Central Broadcasting Corporation	Feature News Award	Award

- TV

Year	Nominations	Awards	Result
2011	"New Zealand Earthquake" / Lin Yi-ru, Zhang Lun-chang / Taiwan Television Company	Instant News Awards	Award
2011	Agricultural Decoding Series Reports: "Searching for Vegetable Insects (Part 1 & 2)" and "Turning Vegetable Soil into Vegetable Gold" / Zong Liting, Huang Zhaohui, Chen Jiayi, Su Qifa, Weng Qiangbin, Xiao Weiren, Li Qihua / People's Television Company	Feature News Award	Award
2011	" The Secret That Cannot Be Touched " / Li Huiren	Investigative Reporting Award	Award
2011	"Fierce Battle at Koshien: Baseball Dreams of Studying Abroad" / Cho Kuan-Chi, Yu Jung-Tsung / Public Television	International News Reporting Award	Award
2011	From lack	Daily News Program Awards	

=== 2012 (11th) ===
- Print media

Year	Nominations	Awards	Result
2012	Rice harvesters are in short supply; an elderly farmer resorts to pesticides; the wind and rain are relentless; the ever-resilient rice harvesting team remains steadfast. / Liu Jinqing, Chen Xinli, Cai Weibin, Gao Tangyao, Chen Wenxing / United Daily News	Instant News Awards	Award
2012	"2012 Great Power Dynamics - The Russian Election" / Liang Yufang / United Daily News	International News Reporting Award	Award
2012	It can hold me back / Chen Hsin-han / China Times	News Photography Award (Single Image)	Award
2012	Taiwan Coastal Disaster / Cheng Szu-di / Business Weekly	News Photography Awards (Series)	Award
2012	The essence of governing a country lies in passion, not numbers / Yu Guoqin / Commercial Times	News Commentary Award	Award
2012	The Vanished Doctor / Yen Chen-yi / Business Today	Feature News Award	Award
2012	Exclusive Investigation: The Secret Behind a Steak / Lin Hsin-fei, Hsiao Fu-yuan, Huang Ching-hsuan / CommonWealth Magazine	Investigative Reporting Award	Award

- Broadcast

Year	Nominations	Awards	Result
2012	Police Radio Evening News: Live Coverage of the June 12 Flood / Zhang Zirong, Lin Mengping, Yang Xiuyun, Zhong Yuanjun, Ye Jiaming, Jiang Guohao, Huang Junwei, Wang Yufen, Zhong Yiru, Jin Jie / Police Radio Station	Instant News Awards	Award
2012	My Days in a Mental Hospital (Series Report) / Liu Yujiao, Zhan Wanru / Central Broadcasting Station	Feature News Award	Award

- TV

Year	Nominations	Awards	Result
2012	Stop! Night Market / Chen Wen-cheng, Hsiao Chih-kuang, Ko Shih-chang, Sun Yun-yu, Liu Yi-ching / CTiTV	Instant News Awards	Award
2012	Matsu Gambling Series Report / Li Qiongyue, Luo Shengda / Public Television	Feature News Award	Award
2012	Eurozone Debt Crisis / Qu Xiangping, Cao Yufan, Lin Lin, Luo Yuanshao, Huang Zhenzhen, Zhang Xinyu, Wang Yiwen, Cai Mingshan, Cai Yuting, Fan Yipei / Central News Agency	International News Reporting Award	Award
2012	International Afternoon Tea / Li Qizhen / One TV	Daily News Program Awards	Award
2012	Nuclear Power Series Reports – “The Secret of Containment Bodies I,” “The Secret of Containment Bodies II,” “Nuclear Waste – A Key Report” / Zong Liting, Su Qifa, Qian Zhiwei, Li Qihua, Weng Qiangbin / People's Television Company	Investigative Reporting Award	Award

=== 2013 (12th) ===
- Print media

Year	Nominations	Awards	Result
2013	A single word difference! Accounting Law review goes awry, amendments fail / Chen Luowei, Chen Nailing, Zheng Hongbin, Su Weirong, Liu Jungu / United Daily News	Instant News Awards	Award
2013	Divided and Reunited / Zhang Ziwu, Huang Zishan / Classic Magazine	International News Reporting Award	Award
2013	Flying Shoes from Outer Space / Kao Pin-yuan / United Daily News	News Photography Award (Single Image)	Award
2013	Nanfeng / Chung Sheng-hsiung / Public Television News Issues Center (PNN)	News Photography Awards (Series)	Award
2013	Is the China International Fair for Trade in Services (CIFTIS) completely rotten? Absolutely! This is what "free trade" is all about. / Sun Qiongli / KuLao.net	News Commentary Award	Award
2013	Taiwan Black Dog Brother's Global War / Lai Ningning, Liu Peixiu, Liu Yuzhen / Business Weekly	Feature News Award	Award
2013	Unveiling the Truth About Fake Rice Noodles: A Series of Investigative Reports / Wang Wenhao, Lin Huizhen / Upstream and Downstream News Market	Investigative Reporting Award	Award

- Broadcast

Year	Nominations	Awards	Result
2013	Police Radio Evening News – Special Report on the “ Lunchbox Incident ” and the “Ban on Live Poultry Slaughter” / Lin Mengping, Zhang Zirong / Police Radio	Instant News Awards	Award
2013	Three Lessons from the Internet – A Series of Reports on Internet Addiction / Zhu Yujuan / Educational Radio Station	Feature News Award	Award

- TV

Year	Nominations	Awards	Result
2013	The Land of Blood and Sweat - On-site report from Bangladesh / Liu Bo-chi, Wei Wen-yuan, Cui Ao-shuang / Sanlih E-Television	Instant News Awards	Award
2013	Factory Closure Workers – Lianfu Hopes for a Spring Breeze / Li Jieling, Li Jinlong, Zhuo Guanqi, Lai Zhenyuan, Zhang Zhilong / Public Television	Feature News Award	Award
2013	From lack	Investigative Reporting Award	
2013	The Death of Damini / Ho Hung-ju, Chu Hsiang-ping, Hung Huang-chun, Chen Po-hua, Tsai Ming-shan, Fan Yi-pei / Central News Agency	International News Reporting Award	Award
2013	News of the Day / Representative: Kao Wei-Chien / Hakka Television	Daily News Program Awards	Award

=== 2014 (13th) ===
- Print media

Year	Nominations	Awards	Result
2014	United Daily News / Exclusive Report on "Blue and Green Collaboration Turns Real-Time Price Registration into Inflated Price" / Jiang Shuohan, Chen Luowei, Li Shunde, Lin Heming	Instant News Awards	Award
2014	New News Weekly / A Revelation 17 Year After the Handover: Hong Kong Today, Taiwan Tomorrow? / Guo Hongzhi, Yang Zhijie	International News Reporting Award	Award
2014	Commercial Times / Liberalization without strategy: more of a curse than a blessing / Yu Guoqin	News Commentary Award	Award
2014	CommonWealth Magazine / Unveiling the Truth About Free Trade / Chen Yishan, Zhang Xiangyi, Chen Liangrong, Gu Shuren	Feature News Award	Award

- Broadcast

Year	Nominations	Awards	Result
2014	Police Radio Taipei Branch / Taipei Metro Random Killing Incident / Liu Biwei, Gao Shiqi, Jin Jie, Liu Siyin, Xie Wenhui	Breaking News and News Program Awards	Award
2014	China National Radio / Rainbow Under the Sun / Zhan Wanru, Liu Yujiao	Feature News Award	Award

- TV

Year	Nominations	Awards	Result
2014	Public Television / Sunflower Movement - Democratic Baptism and Reflections on the Cross-Strait Service Trade Agreement / Lin Hsiao-hui, Lin Chun-hsien, Wang Chi-ju, Chen Shu-chun, Shen Chih-ming, Chen Hsin-lung, Chiang Lung-hsiang, Liu Han-lin, Chen Li-feng, Chang Tzu-chia	Instant News Awards	Award
2014	UDN TV / The Trilogy for Finding a Way for Youth - Higher Education Transformation / Li Bilian, Cai Qingying, Zhang Weidong, Chen Yizhen, Chen Yanwei, Yin Zhigang	Feature News Award	Award
2014	CommonWealth Magazine / Israel - Finding Solutions in Adversity / Luo Yixiu, Xiao Fuyuan, Zhou Yuan	International News Reporting Award	Award
2014	Da Ai TV / The Truth About Pollution / Zhang Zeren, Yang Junting	Investigative Reporting Award	Award
2014	China Investment Cable TV / Central Taiwan Life Network / Wang Shengchun	Daily News Program Awards	Award

=== 2015 (14th) ===
- Print media

Year	Nominations	Awards	Result
2015	United Evening News / Ending Farmhouse Chaos and Curbing Speculation: Major Legislative Amendments / Peng Xuanya, Cheng Ping, Xiao Zhaoping, You Zhiwen, Cai Peifang	Instant News Awards	Award
2015	CommonWealth Magazine / Comprehensive Analysis of the Belt and Road Initiative / Hsiao Fu-yuan, Chen Ching-yi, Li Ming-hsuan, Koo Shu-jen	International News Reporting Award	Award
2015	United Daily News / Marginal Reflection - Observations and Turmoil / Liang Yufang	News Commentary Award	Award
2015	Environmental News Network / Longing for Rain Amidst Drought, Seeking Water for Happiness in Taiwan / Zhu Shujuan	Feature News Award	Award
2015	Business Weekly / Exposing the Absurd Government KPIs / Tian Xiru, Xia Jialing, Zhang Jingwen, Wu Hemao, Liu Peixiu	Investigative Reporting Award	Award
2015	United Daily News, United Evening News / Shocking News in Kaohsiung / Liu Xuesheng	News Photography Awards (Series)	Award
2015	Apple Daily / Formosa Fun Coast Dust Explosion - An Irreparable Pain / Ho Pak-kwan	News Photography Award (Single Image)	Award

- Broadcast

Year	Nominations	Awards	Result
2015	Police Broadcasting Station, Kaohsiung Branch / The Longest Night ~ Kaohsiung Prison Hostage Incident / Zhang Zirong, Fu Yujie, Liu Jinghua, Zhong Yiru, Wei Jingni, Song Ling, Yue Huiling, Lin Jingyi, Lin Mengping	Breaking News and News Program Awards	Award
2015	Cheng Sheng Broadcasting Company Yunlin Radio Station / News 100% - Water Shortage: Opposing Water-Consuming Industries Competing with Residents for Water / Hsu Shih-feng	Feature News Award	Award

- TV

Year	Nominations	Awards	Result
2015	(TVBS) / The Pain of Kaohsiung – A True Account of the Gas Explosion / Chou Shih-yuan, Ho Cheng-feng, Tu Yun-chieh, Ho Yi-hsin, Lee Chan-sheng, Wu Shao-lung, Hsu Ke-cheng, Su Tai-ying, Chao Li, Fang Chih-cheng	Instant News Awards	Award
2015	(TVBS) / Israel - Blue Gold Legend / Li Luomei, Luo Shipeng	International News Reporting Award	Award
2015	(TVBS) / Ten O'Clock Different / Wang Jieling	Daily News Award	Award
2015	Public Television / [The Health Benefits of Smoke] Series Report / Yu Liping, Lü Peiling, Lin Yanru, Ke Jinyuan, Chen Tianbao, Chen Qingzhong, Ye Zhenzhong, Chen Zhongfeng, Zhang Guangzong	Feature News Award	Award
2015	CTiTV / CTi Investigation Report - The Secret You Can't Eat / Peng Hsin-yi, Chan Ching-ling, Chen Wen-cheng, Tsui Chi-chuan, Hsiao Chih-kuang, Tseng Yu-ling, Li Chia-hsin, Chung Ya-hsin, Lu Yao-tung, Chou Tsung-yu	Investigative Reporting Award	Award

=== 2016 (15th) ===
- Plane class

Year	Nominations	Awards	Result
2016	Economic Daily News/Exclusive Report on First Bank ATM Hacking Series/Chiu Chin-lan, Kuo Hsing-yi, Yang Hsiao-yun, Hsia Shu-hsien, Chen Mei-chun	Instant News Awards	Award
2016	Economic Daily / New Thinking on Industrial Transformation and Reconstruction / Lin Hongwen	News Commentary Award	Award
2016	United Daily News / Centenarian Survey - User Manual for a Super-Aged Society / Wei Xinxin, Jiang Huijun, Chen Yuxin, Deng Guifen, Huang Anqi	Feature News Award	Award
2016	Reporters/Investigative Report on "Seeing the Scars on the Land of Kaohsiung"/Cheng Han-wen, Chen Chen-hua, Chen Yi-hua, Ho Jung-hsing	Investigative Reporting Award	Award
2016	Apple Daily / Everyone Has Their Own Plans / Hang Dapeng	News Photography Award (Single Image)	Award
2016	China Times / Earthquake Tragedy: Tainan Earthquake Series / Wang Jinhe	News Photography Awards (Series)	Award

- Broadcast

Year	Nominations	Awards	Result
2016	China National Radio / Live Coverage of the "0206 Earthquake" / Liu Yiling, Pang Qinglian, Wen Lankui, Li Renyue, Feng Jianqi, Zhou Shaohua, Zeng Wuqing, Xie Yerong	Breaking News Awards & News Program Awards	Award
2016	Fisheries Radio Station, Fisheries Agency, Council of Agriculture, Executive Yuan / Coastal Frontline – Marine Conservation Series Report / Chen Yanzhen	Feature News Award	Award

- TV

Year	Nominations	Awards	Result
2016	Public Television / Paris's Two-Time C-Rendezvous / Lin Jingmei, Chen Qingzhong, Wang Xingzhong, Chen Changwei	Instant News Awards	Award
2016	Da Ai TV / Visitors from Syria / Zhao Deyao, Lai Zhanwen, Huang Qilu	International News Reporting Award	Award
2016	Da Ai TV/Major Problems with Concrete/Zhang Zeren, Yang Junting	Investigative Reporting Award	Award
2016	Hakka TV/Dark Night News/Representative: Yu Yuanxuan	Daily News Program Awards	Award
2016	Indigenous Television / Breathing Houses: The Disappearance and Rebirth of Slab Houses (Breathing Slab Houses, Return to Glory, Kapaliwa: Truly Human-Inhabited Tribes) / Kao Yu-Chih, Lee Ling-Ling, Tu Yi-Fan, Yen Chia-Ming	Feature News Award	Award

=== 2017 (16th) ===
- Plane class

Year	Nominations	Awards	Result
2017	United Evening News / "AIDS Discrimination in Taiwan - The Story of Military Academy Student Ali" / He Zhenzhong, Zhang Zongzhi, Li Shuren, He Dingzhao	Instant News Awards	Award
2017	Business Weekly / Fake News Tears Europe Apart / Liu Zhixin, Qiu Biling, Chen Zongyi, Tian Xiru	International News Reporting Award	Award
2017	Reporters/Falsification, Exploitation, and a Sea of Blood and Tears/ Li Xueli, Zheng Hanwen, Jiang Yiting, Lin Youen, Chen Zhenhua, Wu Zhengda, Huang Yuzhen, Li Faxian, Wang Xunpei	Investigative Reporting Award	Award
2016	CommonWealth Magazine / World Champions on Farmland / Lu Guozhen, Deng Kaiyuan, Liu Guangying, Lin Xingfei, Wang Sicheng, Lai Pinjie, Zheng Ningning, Liu Fanxuan, Lin Yiwen, Huang Yuting	In-depth reporting award	Award
2017	United Daily News / Before Entering the Long Night – On Aging and Long-Term Care / Liang Yu-fang	News Commentary Award	Award

- Broadcast

Year	Nominations	Awards	Result
2017	Police Radio Station, National Police Agency, Ministry of the Interior / "Live Report on Major Fatal and Injury Accident of Tour Bus During Cherry Blossom Viewing Tour on National Highway" / Liu Biwei, Jin Jie, Xie Wenhui, Wang Rucong, Lu Mingzong, Gao Shiqi, Feng Xinyi, Wang Hanying, Chen Junhao, Lin Yuqing	Instant News Awards	Award
2017	Police Radio Station, National Police Agency, Ministry of the Interior / "Virtual Netizens, Real Public Welfare" Series Report / Lin Mengping, Jiang Zhengrong	In-depth reporting award	Award

- TV

Year	Nominations	Awards	Result
2017	United Media Corporation / Special Report on "The 2016 White House Battle" / Wang Jieling, Cao Xueqing, Zeng Guanjie, Zeng Honglun, Zhao Yuanying, Yang Hua, Lin Hongyi, Lian Yumin, Ni Jiahui, Duan Shiyuan	Instant News Awards	Award
2017	Sanlih E-Television / Vanishing Borders: Out-of-Control Jihad – Iraq Frontline / Lu Beibei, Wang Shiya, Peng Guangwei, Zhang Junde, Zhang Zheru	International News Reporting Award	Award
2017	People's Television Co., Ltd. / The Non-Existent Child Series Report / Shen Ya-wen, Xie Meng-fu	Investigative Reporting Award	Award
2017	Lianli Media Co., Ltd. / The Path of Aging: The "Road" of Life Amidst Old Age, Illness, and Death / Wang Xinqiao, Zhang Zhenan, Wang Jieling	In-depth reporting award	Award
2017	China Investment Cable Television Co., Ltd. / Nantou News / Representative: Zhou Xuyi	Daily News Program Awards	Award

=== 2018 (17th) ===
- Plane class

Year	Nominations	Awards	Result
2018	Upstream and Downstream News Market / Taipei Agricultural Products Market Closure Series Report / Li Huiyi, Lai Yuwei, Liu Yixin	Instant News Awards	Award
2017	Business Weekly / Influencer President Strives for Indonesia's E-commerce Boom / Kuan Wu-yuan, Wu Yi-kuan, Wang Chih-chieh, Chen Tsung-yi	International Journalism Award	Award
2018	Wealth Magazine Biweekly / Debunking the Myth of Philanthropic Successors of Taiwan's Land Kings / Yao Huizhen, Lin Wenyi	Investigative Reporting Award	Award
2018	Reporters/"Children in the Ruins—20,000 Forgotten Children from High-Risk Families" Series/ Li Xueli, Jian Yongda, Yang Zhiqiang, Zhang Jingwen, Yu Zhiwei, Lin Youen	In-depth reporting award	Award
2018	CommonWealth Magazine / Nojima Takeshi's Current Affairs Column / Nojima Takeshi	News Commentary Award	Award

- News photography

Year	Nominations	Awards	Result
2017	China Times / Masterful Demeanor / Chen Hsin-han	Single News Photography Award	Award
2017	Mirror Weekly / Requiem for a Foreign Land—The Death of Vietnamese Migrant Worker Nguyen Quoc Phi / Yang Zilei	Series of News Photography Awards	Award

- TV

Year	Nominations	Awards	Result
2018	Lianli Media Co., Ltd. / Jing Peng's Hellfire - Engulfing 6 Firefighting Heroes / Han Shanglun, Xu Jingyun, Liao Zongqing, Lin Gengxian, Qian Liru, Li Jie, Lin Minrui, Huang Jianguo, Chen Ruhuan, Wang Hualin	Instant News Awards	Award
2017	Da Ai TV / [The Journey of Clothing] The Secrets of Fashion, Clothing on the Black Earth, Walking with Wisdom / Chen Zhuqi, Zhang Zeren, Yang Junting, Chen Yanshan, Xie Qiquan, Zhang Shuer, Wan Jiahong	International News Reporting Award	Award
2018	United Media Corporation / The Secret Under the Tent / Lin Shang-yun, Zhang Zhen-an	Investigative Reporting Award	Award
2018	Public Television / The Cost of Foresight Series Report / Zhou Chuanjiu, Zheng Zhonghong, Lin Zhenru, Zhang Zhilong, Lou Yajun, Lai Zhenyuan, Zhang Xiaoying, Li Jinlong, Huang Zhengyuan, Chen Tingyu	In-depth reporting award	Award
2018	Datun Cable TV / Greater Taichung News / Lin Chia-pei	Daily News Program Awards	Award

- Broadcast

Year	Nominations	Awards	Result
2018	Central Broadcasting Corporation/Hualien Earthquake Disaster On-site Report Series/Ouyang Mengping, Liu Pinxi	Instant News Awards	Award
2018	Yunlin Radio Station, Zheng Sheng Broadcasting Co., Ltd. / News 100% Series Report: "The City River, Where Does It Go?" / Bai Jixiang, Chen Guanlun, Zeng Xuan, Li Yihui	In-depth reporting award	Award

=== 2019 (18th) ===
- Print and web (text) categories

Year	Nominations	Awards	Result
October 22, 2018 to October 26, 2018	Reporters/Instant Report on the Puyuma Train Accident That Killed 18/Yan Wenting, Chen Liting, Wu Yihua, Huang Yuzhen	Instant News Awards	Award
December 28, 2018 to April 30, 2019	Initium Media / Dragons and Shadows: A Special Report on the Belt and Road Initiative / Chen Hongjin, Wu Jing, Ning Hui, Chen Zhuohui, Zeng Liyu, Guo Jinye, Ákos Keller-Alánt, Namini Wijedasa, Rahima Sohail, Ma Yanyan	International Journalism Award	Award
January 11, 2019	Apple Daily / "GPS Undercover Investigation into the Dark Side of Resource Recycling" / By Ho Po-Chun, Chen Wei-Chou, Chen Ting-Jen, Lin Huan-Cheng, Wu Yi-Ching, Wang Shih-Chuan, Hsueh Ho-Chi, Hu Tsu-Wei, Keng Shih-Ting, and Hou Liang-Ju	Investigative Reporting Award	Award
November 7, 2018	Reporters / "The Bedside Care Crisis: Who Will Safeguard the NT$66 Billion Annual Demand for Inpatient Care?" Series / Yeh Yu-Chuan, Chen Li-Ting, Yang Hui-Chun, Tseng Yuan-Hsin, Chang Shih-Yun, Chen Szu-Hua, Chen Chen-Hua, Huang Yu-Chen, Yu Chung-Jen	In-depth reporting award	Award
November 25, 2018 to November 30, 2018	Reporting/Analysis of Taiwanese Politics After the Nine-in-One Elections / Chen Chia-hung	News Commentary Award	Award

- News photography

Year	Nominations	Awards	Result
May 1, 2019	United Daily News / Typhoon Clashes with Korean Wave / Zheng Qingyuan	Single News Photography Award	Award
February 1, 2019 to February 28, 2019	Classic Magazine / Hunter's Path, Social Road and Maritime Trade Network - The Beginning of Taiwan's Road / Freelance Contributor Jin Chengcai	Series of News Photography Awards	Award

- Television and Internet (Audio-Visual) Category

Year	Nominations	Awards	Result
June 21, 2019 to July 27, 2019	Taiwan Television Company / Full Record of the Launch of Formosat-7 to the Sky / Ou Yi-hui, Lin Tzu-yin, Lin Yi-ru, Huang Chun-hao, Wang Tsung-han, Chen Chia-yi, Wu Kuang-ti, Chan Hung-shun, Tsai Chia-chen, Cho Huan-chun	Instant News Awards	Award
December 29, 2018	Hakka TV / "The Mother Tongue Battle of the Iberian Peninsula" / Chen Xinyu, Luo Yingzhan	International News Reporting Award	Award
September 10, 2018; September 17, 2018; December 17, 2018	Public Television / Forest Life and Death / Chen Chia-li, Yu Li-ping, Chen Ching-chung, Chen Tien-pao, Ko Chin-yuan, Lai Kuan-cheng, Yen Tzu-wei, Chen Chung-feng	Investigative Reporting Award	Award
October 24, 2018 to February 8, 2019	United Media Corporation / Justice for Temporary Workers – I Am Not Your Disposable Chopsticks / Lin Shang-yun, Ke Sheng-xiong	In-depth reporting award	Award
May 17, 2019 and May 16, 2019	People's Television Co., Ltd. / FTV English News / Representative: Hu Wanling	Daily News Program Awards	Award

- Broadcast

Year	Nominations	Awards	Result
October 21, 2018 and October 22, 2018	Police Radio Station, National Police Agency, Ministry of the Interior / Puyuma Express Overturning Breaking News / Chang Tzu-jung, Lin Hui-chen, Lo Chia-hui, Yang Sheng-ru, Cheng Chi-wei	Instant News Awards	Award
August 7, 2018 to May 28, 2019	Hsinchu Science Park Broadcasting Corporation / IC Integrated Circuits‧Sixty Year of Brilliance / Liu Chung-Chi, Li Chih-Ang	In-depth reporting award	Award

=== 2020 (19th) ===
- Print and web (text) categories

Year	Nominations	Awards	Result
August 24, 2019 to July 1, 2020	Central News Agency / "Leaving or Staying" - Series Reports on the Hong Kong Anti-Extradition Bill Protests / Shen Pengda	Instant News Awards	Award
July 9, 2020	Mirror Weekly / Prisoners of the Nation: Lawyers Wang Quanzhang, Chen Hongjin, Chen Meijing, Wu Weishao, Zou Wenhan, and Zhao Junhao in the 709 Crackdown in China	International Journalism Award	Award
July 23, 2020	Upstream and Downstream News Market / Investigation into Photovoltaics Invading Agriculture: Direct Coverage of Hundreds of Cases, Exposing Four Major Problems / Cai Jiashan	Investigative Reporting Award	Award
December 27, 2019	United Daily News Vision Project / The Invisible Agricultural Army / Chung Sheng-hsiung	In-depth reporting award	Award
July 27, 2019 to July 13, 2020	CommonWealth Magazine / Zhang Jieping's Column "Recording the Fall of Hong Kong for the Times" / Zhang Jieping	News Commentary Award	Award

- News photography

Year	Nominations	Awards	Result
April 9, 2020	Penghu Times / "Moments of Fear" / Weng Qingya	Single News Photography Award	Award
July 1, 2019 to January 1, 2020	Reporter/Hong Kong Anti-Extradition Bill Movement – A Blazing Black Tide/Chen Langxi	Series of News Photography Awards	Award

- Television and Internet (Audio-Visual) Category

Year	Nominations	Awards	Result
November 16, 2019 to November 22, 2019	Public Television / "Smoke and Fire Rise Under the Desolate Sun": A Chronicle of the Hong Kong Polytechnic University Protest / Lin Jingmei, Wang Xingzhong, Zhang Zijia	Instant News Awards	Award
August 24, 2019	Sanlih E-Television / The Largest Sun Drifting Operation in History / Hsiang Chen-wei, Ho Shih-te	International Journalism Award	Award
February 1, 2020 to July 11, 2020	People's Television Co., Ltd. / The Disappearing Farmland Series / Huang Jianzhang, Xiao Weiren	Investigative Reporting Award	Award
February 10, 2020	Public Television / Unseen Light Series Report / Lü Peiling, Yan Ziwei	In-depth reporting award	Award
February 4, 2020 and June 11, 2020	Lianli Media Co., Ltd. / Ten O'Clock Different / Wang Jieling	Daily News Award	Award

- Broadcast and Internet (Audio)

Year	Nominations	Awards	Result
July 23, 2020 to July 25, 2020	Police Radio Station / "Do You Want to Get Trouble?" Series Report / Lu Mingzong	International or National Journalism Awards	Award
June 24, 2020	National Educational Radio (Hualien Branch) / Cement Kiln Burning Waste: Hualien's Crisis or Turning Point? / Huang Kaixin	Local Journalism Awards	Award
May 4, 2020 and May 18, 2020	Legal Radio by Yang Guizhi / Legal Plain Language Movement & SoundOn Collaboration Team	Podcast News Program Awards	Award

- News Narrative Innovation Award

Year	Nominations	Awards	Result
August 12, 2019	Initium Media/Morakot 10th Anniversary Special Page: After the Rain, Taiwan's Gradually Changing Face	News Narrative Innovation Award	Award

=== 2021 (The 20th) ===
- Print and web (text) categories

Year	Nominations	Awards	Result
August 11, 2020	Initium Media / Editorial Department Under Mass Raid: A Day in the Life of Seven Apple Daily Reporters / Li Huiyun, Lin Kexin, Yu Meixia, Chen Liya	Breaking News Award	Award
July 2, 2021	United Daily News Group / Lonely Deaths During the Pandemic / Hsu Shih-kai	Feature News Award	Award
February 8, 2021	Business Today / Gamers / Yang Shaohua, Yang Junjie, Xu Youying	Explanation Reporting Award	Award
August 1, 2020 to July 31, 2021	UMedia / Rational Reflections on Society, Politics, Humanity, and Science Amidst the COVID-19 Pandemic / Wang Huipo	News Commentary Award	Award

- News photography

Year	Nominations	Awards	Result
May 1, 2021	Classic Magazine / Newlyweds taking wedding photos at Sun Moon Lake / Liu Zizheng	Single News Photography Award	Award
July 1, 2021	Reporter/Chronic Hong Kong Injury/Ko Chung-ming	Series of News Photography Awards	Award

- Television and Internet (Audio-Visual) Category

Year	Nominations	Awards	Result
April 2, 2021 to April 4, 2021	TVBS News Department, United Media Corporation / Instant News' "Distance" Challenge! Taiwan Railways Administration's "Taroko Express Accident" Follow-up / TVBS News Department, United Media Corporation	Breaking News Award	Award
October 19, 2020	Public Television / Something Happened in Western Xinjiang: Who Stole Our Sand? / Lü Peiling, Chen Qingzhong, Yan Ziwei, Chen Tianbao	In-depth reporting award	Award
August 12, 2020 and April 27, 2021	Public Television/News Global Talk/Huang Mingming	News Program Awards	Award

- Broadcast or Internet (Audio)

Year	Nominations	Awards	Result
December 28, 2020 to February 15, 2021	Central Broadcasting Corporation's "Good Morning Taiwan" program / "Searching for the Place Where the Child's Pillow Is" series report / Zeng Guohua	National Journalism Award	Award
March 6, 2021	National Education Radio / Taipei for the Poor: The Many Flavors of Life for the Homeless / Huang Baiyan	Local Journalism Awards	Award
January 7, 2021 and July 29, 2021	Reported by Liu Zhixin, Lan Wanzhen, and Hong Qinxuan of "The Real Story"	Podcast News Program Awards	Award

- Regardless of media category

Year	Nominations	Awards	Result
February 10, 2021 to July 29, 2021	Central News Agency / Crossing the Turkish-Syrian Border / He Hongru	International Journalism Award	Award
September 9, 2020 to June 16, 2021	Mirror Weekly / Investigative Report on the Shi Muqin Case and the Death of a Bank Employee / Liu Zhiyuan, Lin Junhong, Wu Mingyi	Investigative Reporting Award	Award
May 5, 2021	CommonWealth Magazine / Zero Carbon New Economy / Liu Guangying, Lü Guozhen, Lin Qiwei, Wang Qinggang	Financial News Awards	Award
February 7, 2021	Mirror Media / The Silent Final Chapter – The Prophet of Global Warming and Doomsday Disaster / Mirror Media	News Narrative Innovation Award	Award
September 2, 2020; November 4, 2020; January 29, 2021	Radio Free Asia / "Hong Kong Arts and Culture in Disobedience" Series / Mou Yingxin, Duan Shiyuan, Huang Qiongyu, Xu Shuting, Cao Yufen	Arts and Culture Journalism Award	Award

=== 2022 (21st) ===
- Print and web (text) categories

Year	Nominations	Awards	Result
October 17, 2021	Initium Media / Who Lives in City Center? / Li Yi'an	Breaking News Award	Award
May 12, 2022	Business Weekly / Dear Families with Depression / Kuang Wenqi, Zheng Yumeng, You Yutang, Cai Liangxuan, Guo Hanling	Feature News Award	Award
November 17, 2021 to November 22, 2021	Reporter/The Era of Complete Scams Has Arrived: A Direct Look at Immersive Scams in the Social Network Age/Reporter	Explanation Reporting Award	Award
September 22, 2021 to June 29, 2022	CommonWealth Magazine / Chen Liangrong's Column / Chen Liangrong	News Commentary Award	Award

- News photography

Year	Nominations	Awards	Result
July 20, 2022	ETtoday Eastern Media / People First / Lin Jingmin	Single News Photography Award	Award
May 25, 2022	Mirror Weekly / Frontline Frontline / Zhang Ganqi	Series of News Photography Awards	Award

- Television and Internet (Audio-Visual) Category

Year	Nominations	Awards	Result
October 14, 2021 to May 19, 2022	TVBS-N/The devastating fire in City Center, which killed 46 and injured 43, exposes the deep-seated problems of old, complex buildings/Yang Lifen, Ho Yi-hsin, Huang Hsiao-chi, Fang Chih-cheng, Wu Chung-hsun	Breaking News Award	Award
December 13, 2021 to December 19, 2021	Da Ai TV/Medical Love and Abusive Care/Wu Zhiyi, Zhang Luejia	Short In-Depth Reporting Award	Award
June 15, 2022 to June 17, 2022	CommonWealth Magazine / Water Crisis Island / Li Luomei, Zhang Hanqing, Lin Youcheng, Yu Ziyao	Long-form in-depth reporting award	Award
May 28, 2022 and July 30, 2022	Sanlih Television / The Vanishing Borders / The Vanishing Borders Production Team	News Program Awards	Award

- Broadcast or Internet (Audio)

Year	Nominations	Awards	Result
July 28, 2022 and July 29, 2022	Police Radio Station, National Police Agency, Ministry of the Interior / "Saving Lives and Maintaining Privacy" Series Report / Lu Ming-Tsung	Broadcast Journalism Awards	Award
June 14, 2022 and June 17, 2022	ETtoday/I Was at the Crime Scene/Chen Fengde, Huang Ziyu, Zhou Yiru, Zhou Tingwei, Zeng Yunqi	Podcast News Program Awards	Award

- Regardless of media category

Year	Nominations	Awards	Result
March 17, 2022 to July 25, 2022	Reporters/Destruction and Survival in the War of the Century: A Five-Month Record of the Russo-Ukrainian War/Liu Zhixin, Yang Zilei, Chen Yingyu	International Journalism Award	Award
July 29, 2022	Mirror Weekly/Youth Purgatory: A Chronicle of Online Deceptive Private Video Scandals/Jiang Yiting, Hang Dapeng, Li Youru, Zeng Liyu, Lin Yuanting	Investigative Reporting Award	Award
June 20, 2022	Business Today / A Look at True and False ESG: A Series of Reports / Business Today Editorial Team	Financial News Awards	Award
July 10, 2022	Reporters/Dating × PUA × Fake Investment: Deconstructing "Immersive Scams" and the 4 Countermeasures You Need/Ke Haoxiang, Hong Qinxuan, Liu Zhixin, Jiang Shimin	News Narrative Innovation Award	Award
June 20, 2022	Reporters / "The New Era of Taiwanese Comics - How to Forge Our Own Path Amidst the Onslaught of Japanese and Korean Comics?" / Chen Delun, Hong Qinxuan, Chen Yijing, Li Xueli, Yang Zilei	Arts and Culture Journalism Award	Award

=== 2023 (22nd) ===
- Print and web (text) categories

Year	Nominations	Awards	Result
May 11, 2023 to May 12, 2023	United Daily News / Fatal 40 Seconds! The Unstoppable Central-Czech Train / United Daily News Metropolitan Local Center Interview Team	Breaking News Award	Award
November 7, 2023	Mirror Weekly / Case of a Single Mother Who Killed Her Two Children / Chien Chu-shu, Hang Da-peng	Feature News Award	Award
December 29, 2022	Business Weekly / Germany Launches Hydrogen Train, Ushering in the Hydrogen Era / By Lu Guozhen, Huang Huiqun, Guan Wuyuan, and Chen Zongyi	Explanation Reporting Award	Award
February 14, 2023 to July 11, 2023	Xin Media / Lin Xiangkai's Column on the Eve of Revolution / Lin Xiangkai	News Commentary Award	Award

- News photography

Year	Nominations	Awards	Result
August 3, 2022	United Daily News / Recording a Historic Moment: Pelosi's Plane Lands in Taiwan / Kao Pin-yuan	Single News Photography Award	Award
November 9, 2022	Reporter/Yang Zilei, Death Basement in Yashidne	Series of News Photography Awards	Award

- Television and Internet (Audio-Visual) Category

Year	Nominations	Awards	Result
	From lack	Breaking News Award	Award
June 26, 2023	Mirror TV / The Concern of Restricted Youth TikTok Addiction / Hsu Pei-chen, Tai Chia-yi, Chen Yueh-wei, Liang Li-ling, Ko Hung-chien	Short In-Depth Reporting Award	Award
June 24, 2023	Lianli Media / Lonely Death in the Era of Great Care: The Road to Survival / Wang Xinqiao, Zhang Zhenan	Long-form in-depth reporting award	Award
May 5, 2023 and August 26, 2023	China Television/CTS News Magazine/CTS News Magazine Team	News Program Awards	Award

- Broadcast or Internet (Audio)

Year	Nominations	Awards	Result
May 10, 2023 to May 31, 2023	National Education Radio Hualien Branch / Let's talk in Taiglish? Campus Bilingual Speaking Program / Zhao Jiayun, Lin Wenling, Lin Xiaojun	Broadcast Journalism Awards	Award
September 14, 2022	Reporters: The Real Story / Wan-Ju Chan, Hsueh-Li Lee, Wan-Chen Lan, Fu-Nian Tsao, Te-Lun Chen	Podcast News Program Awards	Award

- Regardless of media category

Year	Nominations	Awards	Result
January 9, 2023	Vision Project, United Daily News / 99 vs 1 War: COP27 Live Coverage and Taiwan Survival Analysis / Lin Huan-cheng, Lin Yung-hsuan, Tsai Ching-ying, Chou Yu-ching, Su Yen-cheng	International Journalism Award	Award
August 24, 2022	Reporters/Money and Power in the Garbage Black Market: The Formation of a Criminal Chain of Industrial Waste/Ho Po-Chun, Lin Hui-Chen, Fang Te-Lin, Ko Hao-Hsiang, Hung Chin-Hsuan	Investigative Reporting Award	Award
April 16, 2023	Sanlih E-Television / Battle of the Smallest Space - Unveiling the Silicon Island / Hou Chien-Chou, Li Wen-Yi, Fan Yi-Hua, Lin Chien-Hung, Ou Chun-Chieh	Financial News Awards	Award
August 24, 2022	Reporter / Reconstructing a Crime That Was Vanished in 12 Hours / How Were Tens of Thousands of Tons of Waste Quietly Buried Deep in the Land of Taiwan Sugar Corporation? / Reporter Team	News Narrative Innovation Award	Award
December 16, 2022 to January 9, 2023	Reporters / "Taiwanese Arts and Culture: A Search for and Echoes Amidst a Sense of National Subjugation" / Yang Huijun, Zhang Ziwu, Yu Zhiwei, Huang Shize	Arts and Culture Journalism Award	Award

=== 2024 (23rd) ===
- Print and web (text) categories

Year	Nominations	Awards	Result
April 4, 2024 to April 6, 2024	Liberty Times/Resilient Island – A Chronicle of the 0403 Hualien Earthquake/Liberty Times 0403 Hualien Earthquake Coverage Team	Breaking News Award	Award
March 7 to April 6, 2024	Initium Media/Sunflower: A Decade in a Moment: Sports Memories and Echoes/Initium Media Team	Feature News Award	Award
June 25, 2024	Reporters/The Road to Paradise Through Surrogacy: Their Dreams Shattered, Risks, and Ethical Dilemmas/Cao Funian, Lan Wanzhen, Chen Delun, Hong Qinxuan, Lin Yanting	Explanation Reporting Award	Award
August 12, 2023 to July 29, 2024	Reporter/Chen Zixuan, Sports Culture Columnist for [Long Game]	News Commentary Award	Award

- News photography

Year	Nominations	Awards	Result
April 3, 2024	Central News Agency / The Long Road Home / Zhao Shixun	Single News Photography Award	Award
June 23, 2024	Reporter/Hunting and Redemption: The Dance of Fate for Australian Kangaroos/Chen Yupeng	Series of News Photography Awards	Award

- Broadcast and Internet (Audio)

Year	Nominations	Awards	Result
2024	Fisheries Radio Station, Fisheries Agency, Ministry of Agriculture / Countdown to the White Storm - Taiwan Dairy Farmers' Survival Battle / Qin Qing, Xu Jiaren	Broadcast Journalism Awards	Award
December 20, 2023	Reporters: Zhan Wanru, Xu Shikai, Li Xueli, Yang Zilei, Chen Sihua (from The Real Story)	Podcast News Program Awards	Award

- Television and Internet (Audio-Visual) Category

Year	Nominations	Awards	Result
September 22, 2023	Lianli Media / 10 Dead, Hundreds Injured in Mingyang International Explosion! The Gray Zone That Vulcan's Tears Can't Wash Away / TVBS News Department Southern Center	Breaking News Award	Award
May 6, 2024	Young Reporter / A Gap in Life: Taiwan's First Leukemia Patient to Fight for Medical Treatment on His Own Faces His 20th Birthday Graduation Exam / Lin You-en, Zheng Han-wen, Yu Zhi-wei, Yang Hui-jun, Wu Jia-yuan	Short In-Depth Reporting Award	Award
June 24, 2023	Lianli Media / Lonely Death in the Era of Great Care: The Road to Survival / Wang Xinqiao, Zhang Zhenan	Long-form in-depth reporting award	Award
May 27, 2024	People's Television Network / "Out-of-Control Online Gambling" Series Report / Wen Yuping, Lai Guanyu, Lü Jiongwei, Li Qihua, Shi Cenyan	Long-form in-depth reporting award	Award
2024	Lianli Media/Focus Global News/Focus Global News Production Team	News Program Awards	Award

- Regardless of media category

Year	Nominations	Awards	Result
January 24, 2024	Public Television / Myanmar Fireworks / Luo Shengda, Su Weiming, Yang Zhiqiang, Lü Jiongwei	International Journalism Award	Award
June 3, 2024	Reporters/The Child Hunting Storm: Unveiling the Dark Industry Chain of Child Sexual Exploitation Images/He Kongdelian, Zhang Ziwu, Hong Qinxuan	Investigative Reporting Award	Award
December 7, 2023	Business Weekly / Carbon Reduction Dream Turns into Dioxin Crisis / Business Weekly Team	Financial News Awards	Award
October 17, 2023	Reporter/How the PLA is Advancing Through the First Island Chain: US-Japan Military Deployment Affected by a Taiwan Strait Conflict/Reporter Team	News Narrative Innovation Award	Award
July 10, 2023 to January 9, 2023	Taipa News / Good Intentions Smeared: Distorted Public Art / Hong Minlong	Arts and Culture Journalism Award	Award

== List of past winners of the Zeng Xubai Journalism Award ==
Established in 1974, it was incorporated into the "Excellent Journalism Award Foundation" in 2009.

=== 2009 (First Session) ===
Year	Nominations	Awards	Result
2009	"Ratings Journalism: The Commercialization of Taiwanese Television News" / Lin Chao-chen / National Chiao Tung University	Journalism Academic Works Award	Award
2009	"Rural Survival Games" Series Report / Li Huiyi, Chen Tianbao, Ye Zhenzhong / Public Television	Public Service Reporting Award	Award

=== 2010 (Second Session) ===
Year	Nominations	Awards	Result
2010	From lack		

=== 2011 (Third Session) ===
Year	Nominations	Awards	Result
2011	"The Weight of Journalists: The Imagination and Practice of Political Journalists in Taiwan" / Huang Shun-hsing / Shih Hsin University	Journalism Academic Works Award	Award
2011	"The Destruction of a Nation Through Furnace Slag" / Liu Liren, Zhou Minhong, Li Rongping, Tang Shiming, Lin Jiaqi, Wu Weigong, Chen Wenzheng, Lin Yizhang, Yang Jincheng, Huang Bolang	Public Service Reporting Award	Award

=== 2012 (4th) ===
Year	Nominations	Awards	Result
2012	From lack	Journalism Academic Works Award	
2012	"Long-Term Care in Denmark" Series Report / Zhou Chuanjiu, Zheng Zhonghong / Public Television	Public Service Reporting Award	Award

== List of past recipients of the Lifetime Achievement Award in Journalism ==
Established in 2010, the award is given every two Year. Award recipients are individuals who have worked in journalism for more than 20 years and have made outstanding contributions to the media profession.

=== 2010 (First Session) ===
Year	Nominations	Awards	Result
2010	Yin Yunpeng / Chairman, Publisher & Editor-in-Chief / CommonWealth Magazine Group	Lifetime Achievement Award in Journalism	Award

=== 2012 (Second Session) ===
Year	Nominations	Awards	Result
2012	Wu Fengshan	Lifetime Achievement Award in Journalism	Award

== List of past recipients of the Special Contribution Award for Journalism ==
Established in 2014.

=== 2014 (First Session) ===
Year	Nominations	Awards	Result
2014	Feng Xiaofei / Founder of Upstream and Downstream News Market	Special Contribution Award for Journalism	Award

=== 2016 (Second Session) ===
Year	Nominations	Awards	Result
2016	Ko Chin-Yuan / Public Television Documentary Director and Producer	Special Contribution Award for Journalism	Award

=== 2018 (3rd) ===
Year	Nominations	Awards	Result
2018	Li Huiren / Independent Documentary Director	Special Contribution Award for Journalism	Award

=== 2020 (4th) ===
Year	Nominations	Awards	Result
2020	Wang Jianzhuang / Chairman of Up Media	Special Contribution Award for Journalism	Award

=== 2022 (5th) ===
Year	Nominations	Awards	Result
2022	Zhang Ganqi / Professional News Photographer	Special Contribution Award for Journalism	Award

== List of past winners of the Public Service Award ==
Established in 2005, the award is presented every two Year. (Award recipients: Media organizations)

=== 2005 (First Session) ===
Year	Nominations	Awards	Result
2005	Wu Guocheng's Twenty-Six Year with "Mountain City" / Wu Guocheng / Mountain City Weekly	Social Public Service Award	Award

=== 2007 (Second Session) ===
Year	Nominations	Awards	Result
2007	KuLao.net / Representative: Sun Qiongli / KuLao.net	Social Public Service Award	Award

=== 2009 (Third Session) ===
Year	Nominations	Awards	Result
2009	Environmental Information Center / Founder: Chen Ruibin / Environmental Information Center, Taiwan Environmental Information Association	Social Public Service Award	Award

=== 2011 (4th) ===
Year	Nominations	Awards	Result
2011	Four Directions Daily / Taiwan Libao Press	Social Public Service Award	Award

=== 2013 (5th) ===
Year	Nominations	Awards	Result
2013	PeoPo Citizen News Platform / Public Television	Social Public Service Award	Award

=== 2015 (6th) ===
Year	Nominations	Awards	Result
2015	Our Island / Public Television	Social Public Service Award	Award

=== 2017 (7th) ===
Year	Nominations	Awards	Result
2017	Citizen Action Audio-Visual Recording Database	Social Public Service Award	Award

=== 2019 (8th) ===
Year	Nominations	Awards	Result
2019	United Daily News Group "Vision Project" team	Social Public Service Award	Award

=== 2021 (9th) ===
Year	Nominations	Awards	Result
2021	Reporter	Social Public Service Award	Award

=== 2023 (10th) ===
Year	Nominations	Awards	Result
2023	Upstream and Downstream News Market	Social Public Service Award	Award

== 20th Anniversary News Reporting Award Grant Program ==
- Jin Qiqi / Inter-island silos (On immigration experience)
- Charitable Trust Scam
- HIT sound production line
- The Collapse of Highland Agriculture
