= Kanifing =

Municipality in the Gambia

- Urban municipality
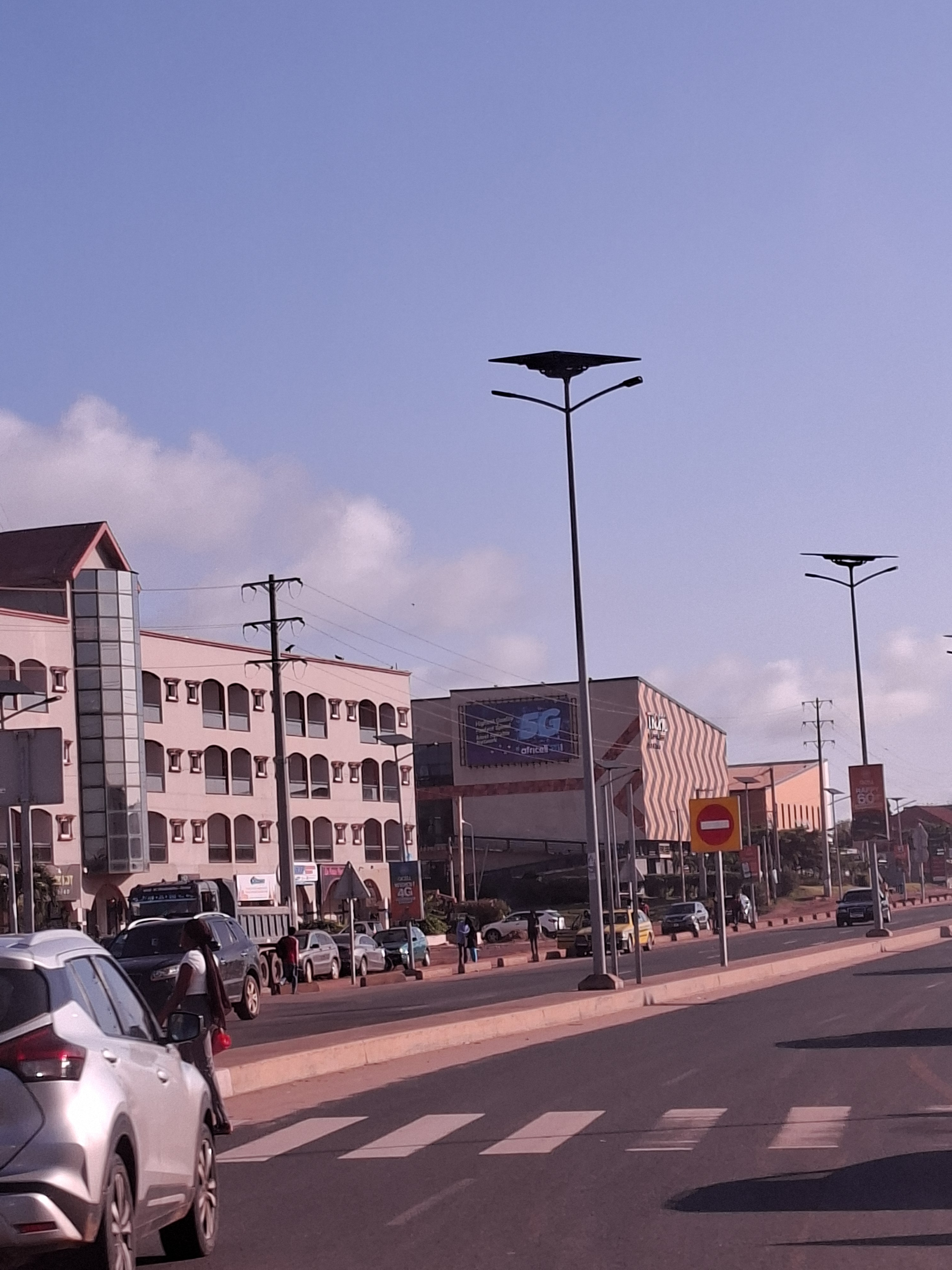
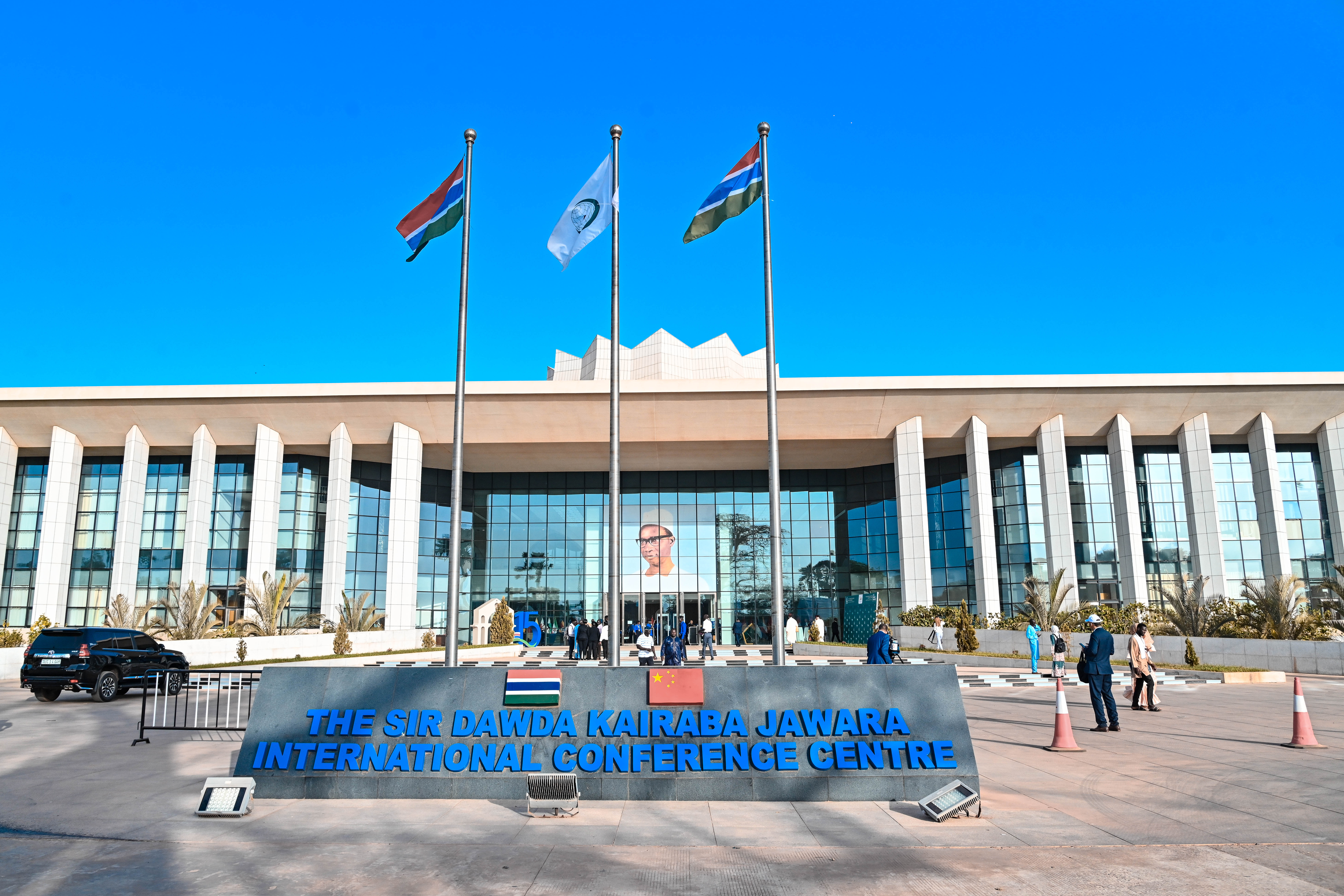
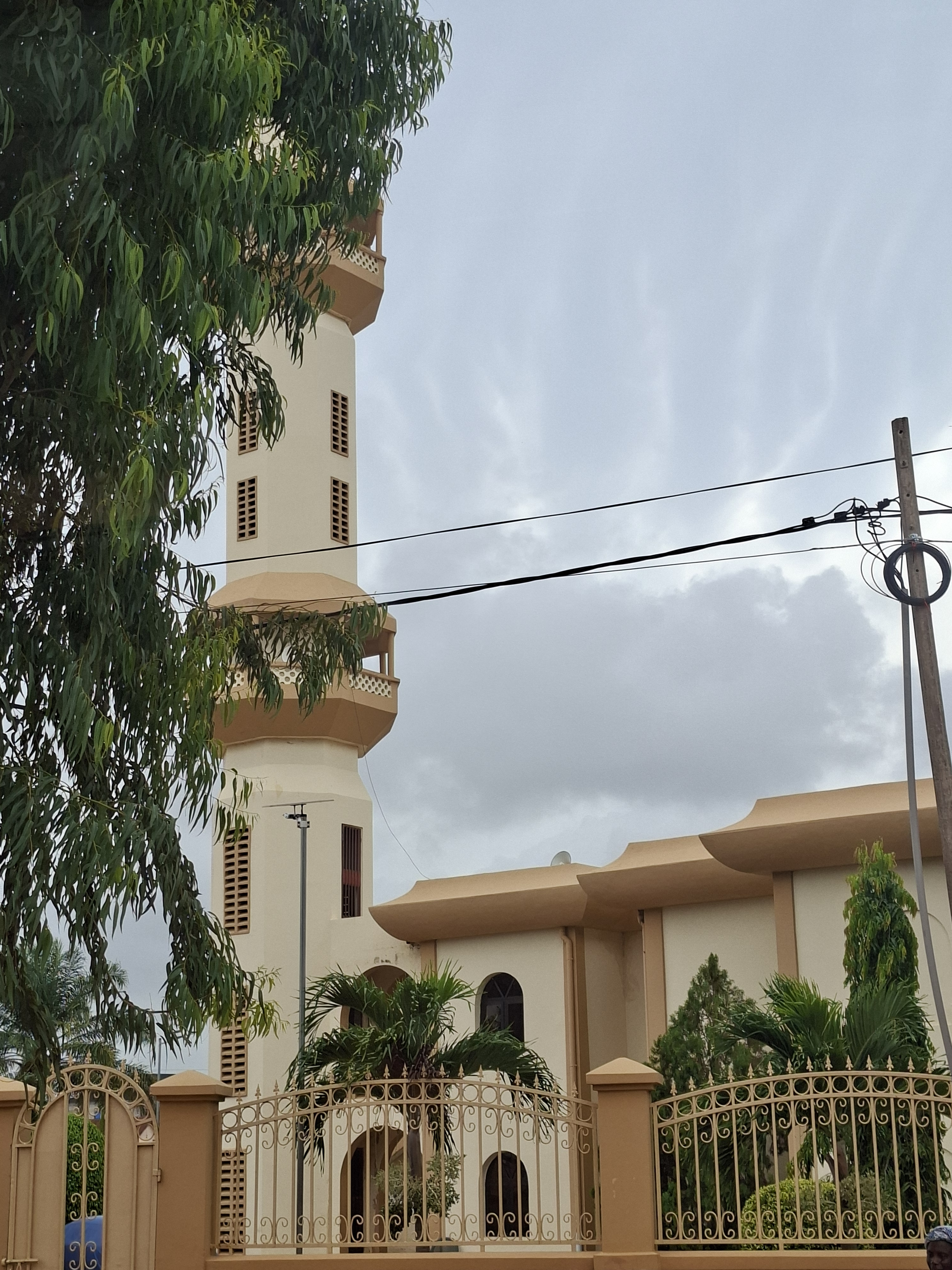
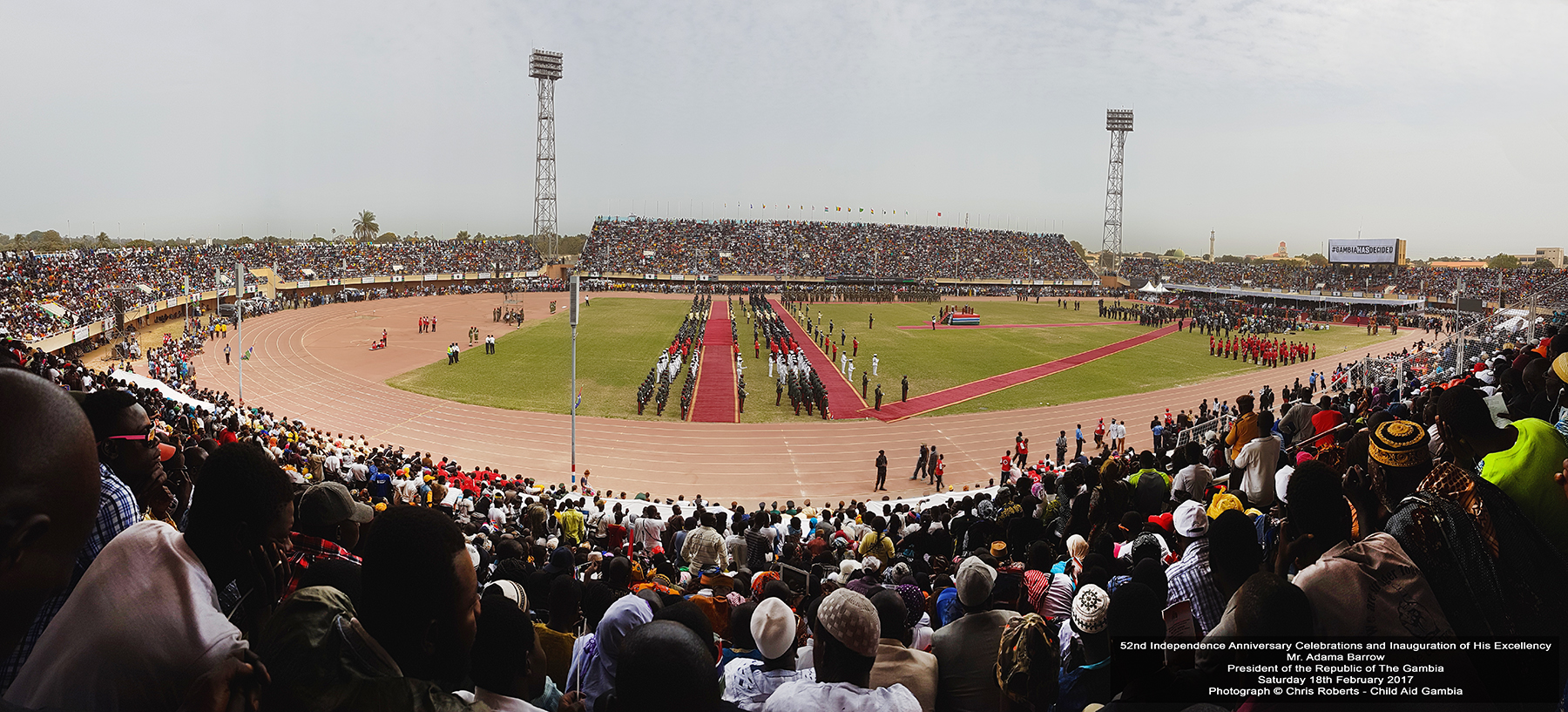
- From left to right: Serekunda Roundabout, Sir Dawda Kairaba Jawara International Conference Center, Banjul International Airport, Pipeline Mosque, and Independence Stadium (Bakau) (Pre renovation),

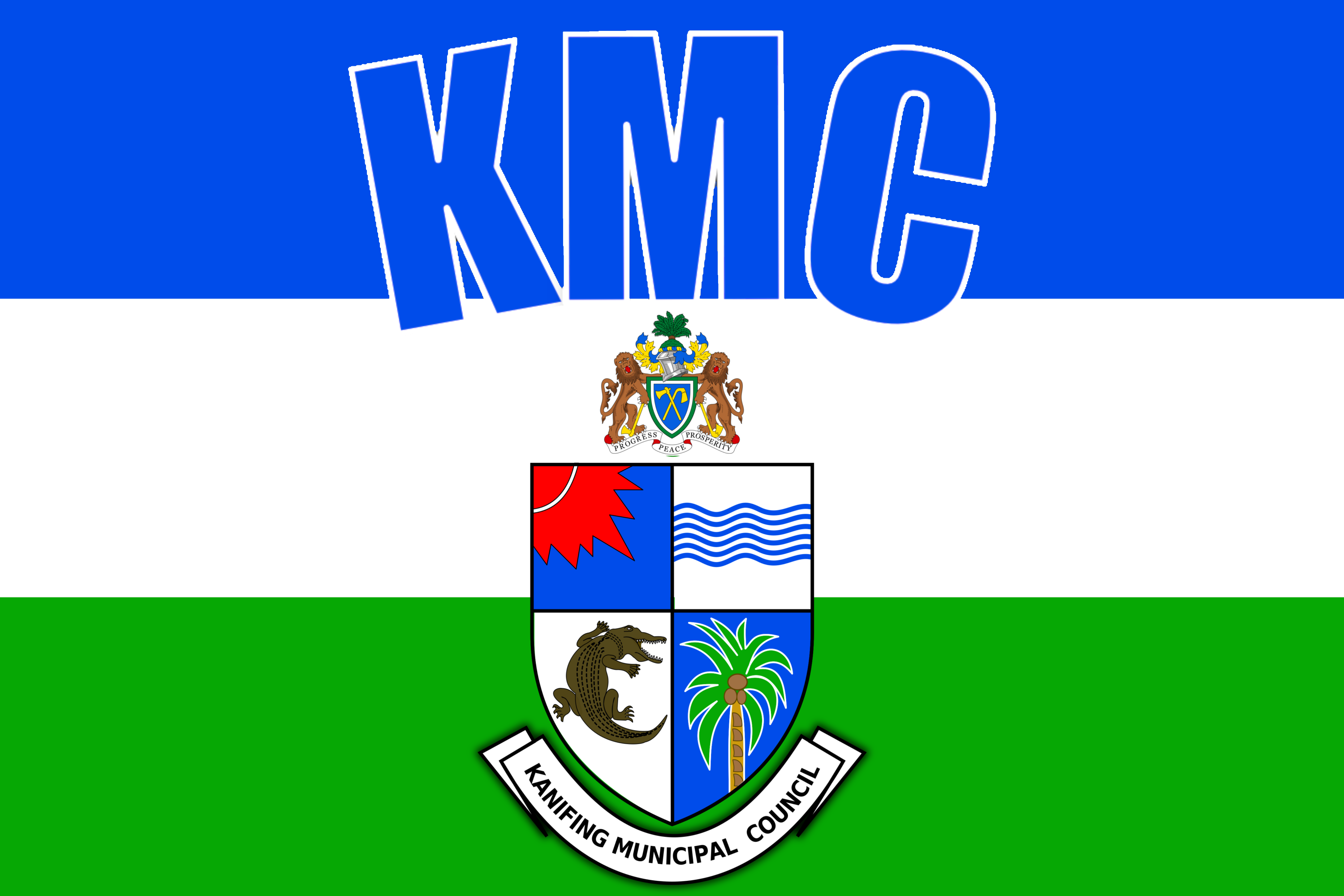
- Flag Coat of arms

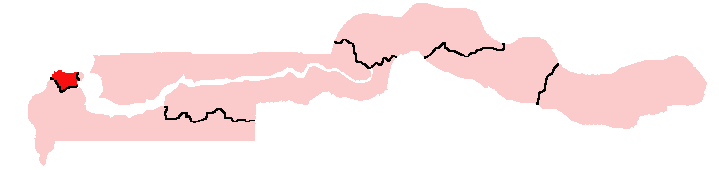
- Location of the Kanifing Local Government Area in The Gambia
- Coordinates: 13°26′51″N 16°40′21″W
- Country: The Gambia
- Local government area: Kanifing
- District: Kanifing

Government
  - Type: Mayor–council government
  - Body: Kanifing Municipal Council
  - Lord Mayor: Talib Ahmed Bensouda (United Democratic Party)

Area
  - Land: 75.5 km^{2} (29.2 sq mi)

Population (2024)
  - Total: 379,348
- Website: http://kanifing.gm/

Kanifing is a municipality, local government area and district in the Gambia. It is part of the Greater Banjul Area, to the west of Banjul, and is governed by Kanifing Municipal Council (KMC).

The population of Kanifing expanded in the post-colonial era, and it is now one of the country's most-densely populated places and its second most-populated district. It received many migrants from the rest of the Gambia and abroad.

Kanifing is the economic centre of the Gambia, and Serekunda is its largest population center. Tourism is a major industry, and here are several higher education institutes, including the University of the Gambia.

== History ==
Sayerr Jobe founded Serekunda, the first settlement in the forested area, in the nineteenth century. He helped establish other settlements in Kanifing, including Bundung and Ebo Town.

In 1840, France ceded a 40-square-kilometre (15 sq mi) area that was called British Kombo and was later renamed Kombo St. Mary. It annexed another French cession in 1853. Kombo St. Mary was part of the Gambia Colony. The Protectorate Ordinances, which was passed between 1894 and 1902, transferred Kombo St. Mary to the administration of the Gambia Protectorate. It returned to the Gambia Colony in 1946. The local government area (LGA) of Kombo St. Mary was created in the 1960s from part of the Brikama LGA, and was the eighth LGA to be established. Kombo Rural Authority was renamed Kanifing Urban District Council in 1974 and Kanifing Municipal Council in 1991.

Kanifing grew significantly in the post-colonial era. This was largely caused by immigration from nearby countries; in 1993, foreign nationals made up 20% of the LGA's population. Kanifing's growth led to an increase in the country's urbanisation rate from 23% in 1973 to 37% in 1993. This expansion led to higher property values and foreign investment.

== Geography ==
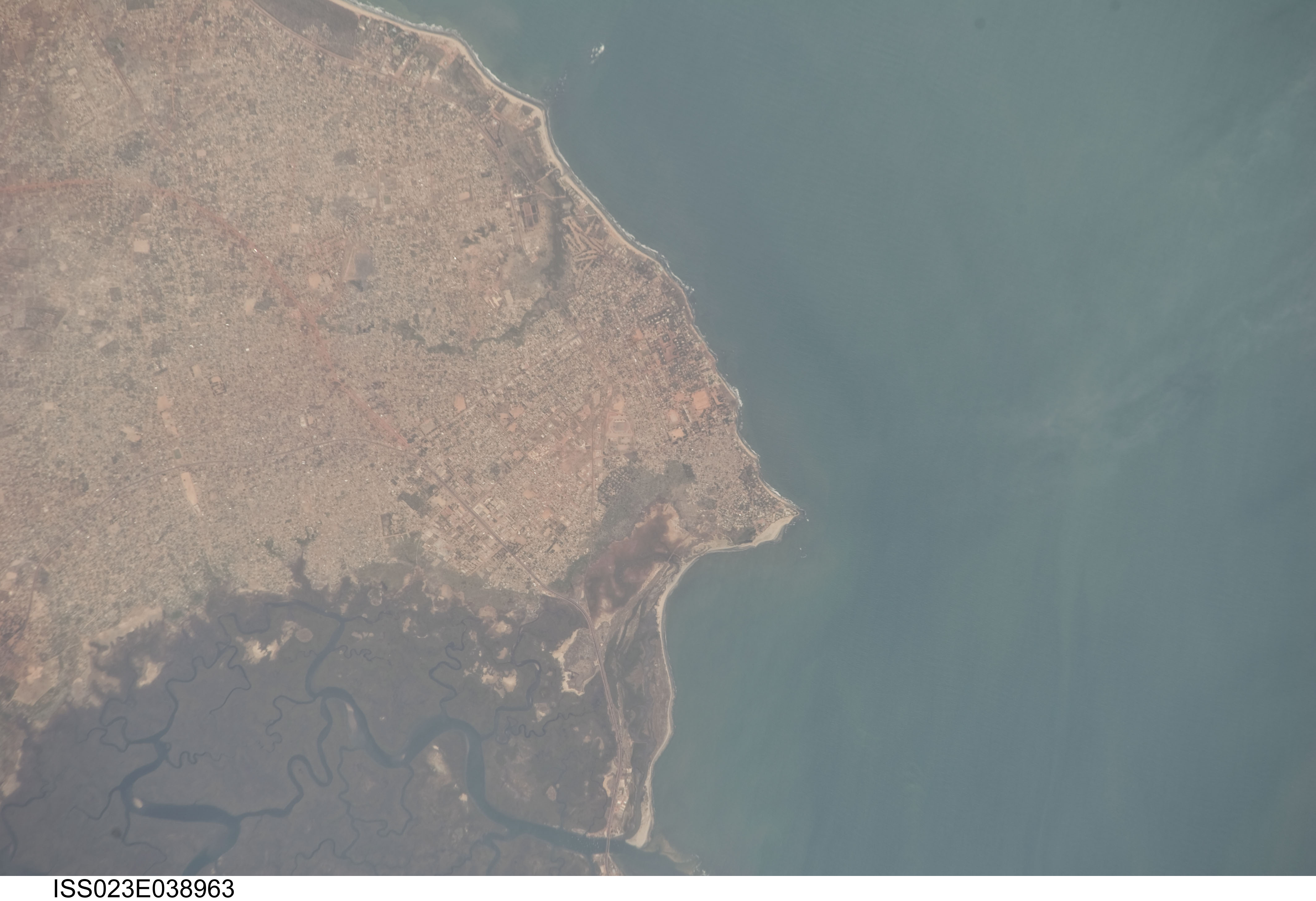
Satellite image of Kanifing, oriented with west on top

Kanifing is one of the eight LGAs of the Gambia, and is only one that contains only one district. The LGA has a land area of 75.5 km^{2} (29.2 sq mi). It lies immediately west of the capital city Banjul; this joint conurbation is known as the Greater Banjul Area. Serekunda, the country's largest urban area, is in Kanifing.

== Demographics ==
Historical population
Year	Pop.	±%
1963	12,208	—
1973	39,404	+222.8%
1983	101,504	+157.6%
1993	228,214	+124.8%
2013	377,134	+65.3%
2024	379,348	+0.6%

Kanifing Municipality has a population of 377,134, as of the 2013 census, making it the country's most-populated and most-densely populated district.

The 2024 Census revealed a population of 379,348 - virtually unchanged since 2013. The sex ratio is 1:1 and the mean household size is 6.7. There are 40,367 people (11.63% of the population) in poverty, 3,340 (1.0%) in extreme poverty, and 117,648 (33.9%) in food poverty.

The predominantly rural Mandinka people moved to cities in the post-colonial era. Kanifing's share of the Gambia's Mandinka population increased from 3% in 1963 to 16% in 1993. In 1993, Kanifing had about a third of the country's Jola people, about a quarter of Serahuli people, nearly a third of Serer people, and the majority of Aku people. It had nearly half of the country's Christians.

The population has grown through both internal migration and immigration, being home in 2013 to 30% of the Gambia's immigrants and 35% of the country's internal migrants. The total number of immigrants was 33,790, of whom 34% were from Senegal and 25% were from Guinea.

In Kanifing and Banjul, the Wolof language is spoken as a lingua franca in multi-ethnic groups, rather than Mandinka as in the rest of the country.

=== Settlements ===
Kanifing has 19 settlements:

Settlements in Kanifing
Settlement	Population		
Settlement	2013	2003	1993
Abuko	15811	8958	4345
Bakau New Town	25265	31600	26687
Bakau Wasulun	3545	1312	2195
Bakoteh	16924	17161	6594
Bundungka Kunda	55360	51869	41369
Dippa Kunda	17654	14965	15081
Ebo Town	22789	18363	2563
Faji Kunda	38121	23969	12744
Kololi	7257	5498	4416
Kotu	16358	11844	4419
Kanifing	14296	—N/a	—N/a
Pipeline	4317	—N/a	—N/a
Latri Kunda German	19765	24045	22902
Latri Kunda Sabiji	15619	14939	11289
Manjai Kunda	18601	14372	4800
New Jeshwang	17394	17023	21656
Old Jeshwang	7552	13319	8480
Serekunda	19944	19292	18901
Talinding	40562	34206	19773

== Administration ==
=== Administrative divisions ===
The wards of Kanifing Municipal Council

Kanifing Municipal Council (KMC) is led by the Lord Mayor of Kanifing, who has administrative duties. Ward councillors manage social and economic duties. KMC is divided into 18 wards: Abuko, Bakau New Town, Bakoteh, Bantaba Bore Hole, Bartez, Bundung Six Junction, Dippa Kunda, Fajikunda, Kanifing, Kololi, Latrikunda Sabiji, London Corner, Manjai Kotu, New Jeshwang/Ebo Town, Old Bakau/Cape Point, Old Jeshwang, Tallinding North, and Tallinding South. It is further divided into seventy-four sub-wards, each led by a sub-ward chairman. The municipality has seven parliamentary constituencies: Serekunda East, Serekunda West, Serekunda Central, Jeshwang, Bakau, Latrikunda Sabiji, and Tallinding.

=== Government ===
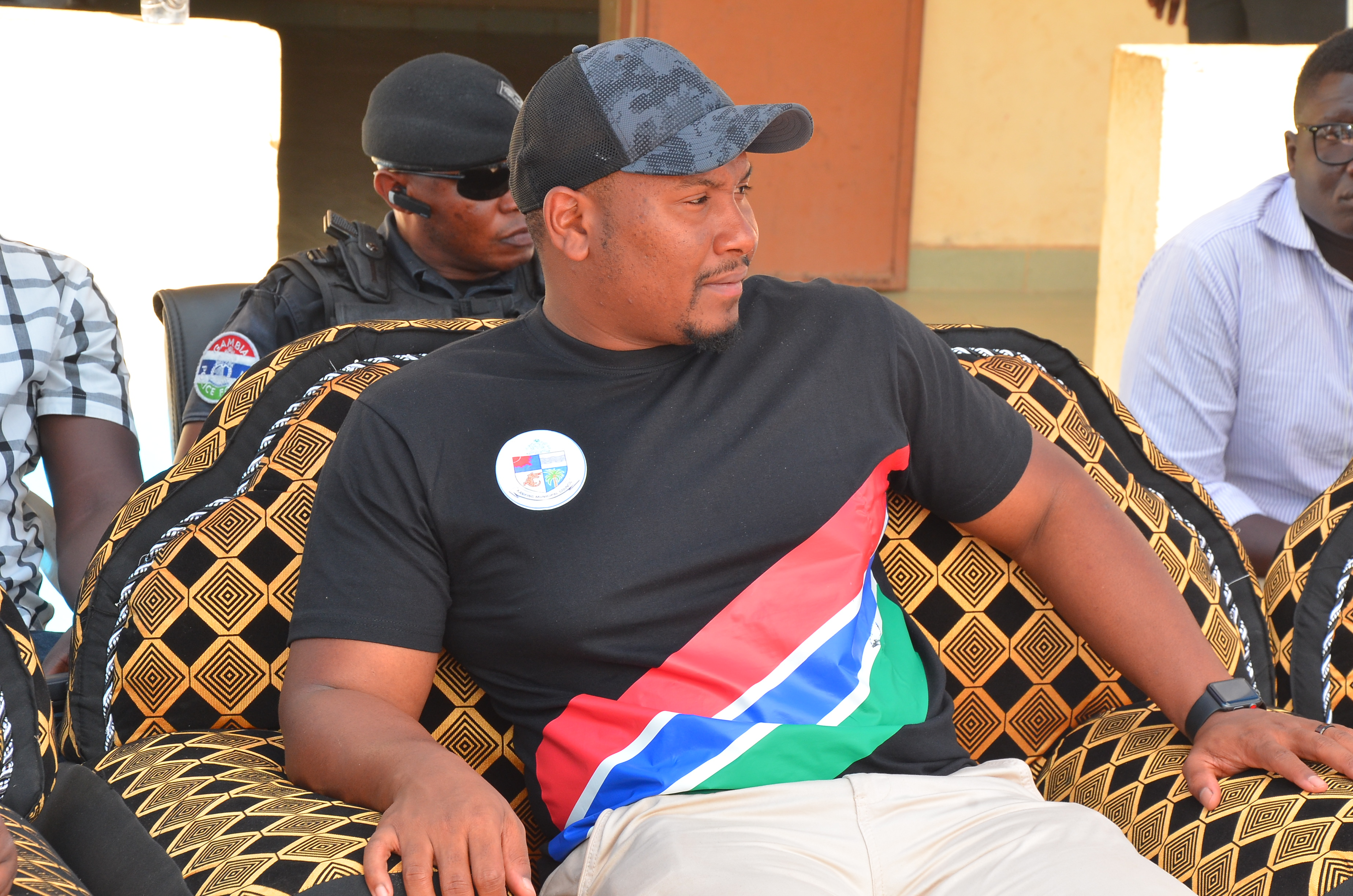
Mayor Talib Ahmed Bensouda

Talib Ahmed Bensouda, a member of the United Democratic Party, was elected Lord Mayor of Kanifing in the 2018 election, and was re-elected in the 2023 election. He is the son of lawyer Amie Bensouda. Talib Ahmed Bensouda succeeded Yankuba Colley as Lord Mayor.

The Deputy Mayor of KMC is Binta Janneh Jallow, who is the first woman to hold the position. Jallow, who was previously the ward councillor of Bakau New Town, was appointed to the post in July 2021 to replace Pa Musa Bah, who had resigned.

As of February 2024, the Crime Management Coordinator of KMC is Pateh Bah, who has held the position since its creation in 2017 by the Adama Barrow administration.

The Law Court Complex in Bundung houses the High Court, the Magistrates Court, and the Cadi Court. Kanifing Magistrates Court functions as the Children's Court on Tuesdays and Thursdays, despite the constitution providing for a full-time juvenile court.

== Economy ==
Kanifing is the main commercial area of the Gambia, and is the district with the highest concentration of industry, hosting a large industrial estate. Most of the Gambia's hotels and coastal resorts lie within the municipality, as does Independence Stadium, the national football stadium. While government administration is an important part of the economy, 50.8% of the workforce is employed in the private sector. Altogether, 32.5% of workers are in wholesale and retail trade, 13% in manufacturing and 17.5% in services.

Of the LGA's 251,712 people who are 15 or older, 122,726 are in the labour force, including 108,474 who are employed and 14,252 who are unemployed. The unemployment rate among workers aged 15 to 35 is 6.5%, relatively low for the Gambia, although within this age range over 20% of those with higher education are unemployed. Child labour affects 3.5% of children aged 5–11, 9.7% aged 12–14, and 14.6% aged 15–17.

Bensouda's government has planned an affordable housing project to build 8,000 homes.

== Infrastructure ==
=== Waste management ===
The Local Government Act (the Gambia) 2002 gives municipalities the responsibility for waste management. The Environment and Sanitation Unit (ESU), part of KMC's Directorate of Services, is responsible for waste and other environmental health issues. The ESU performs daily street cleaning and collects market waste and waste from public facilities, and clears illegal dumps. KMC, which spends 25% of its budget on waste management, has no official waste-separation or recycling programmes.

Bakoteh Dumpsite, the largest landfill in the country, collects all waste from the Greater Banjul Area. It was created as part of a defunct mining operation. It is overfilled and does not have modern disposal systems. It is located in a densely populated area near Bakoteh, Dippa Kunda and Manjai Kunda. The dumpsite's environmental impacts include methane fires, water contamination, and odour. The city hires bulldozers to transport waste to the dump but it is sometimes blocked by waterlogging in the rainy season. Many residents of the area around the dumpsite make a living from informal recycling. KMC has planned to establish a new dumpsite and turn the old one into a transfer station. In 2021, it conducted a pilot program to compost the organic waste in the dump and convert it to biofuel.

The Mbalit project (meaning waste in Wolof) collects household waste; it assigns each ward a garbage truck that collects waste from each household weekly. It uses a digital ticket system to pay for the service. Informal waste collectors use donkey-drawn carts to collect waste from households that are not covered by the project. In 2022, KMC estimated it collected 460 tons of waste per day, of which 57.5% came from households, though this data is imprecise. The city has 370 waste management workers, of whom 227 are under the ESU and 143 are under the Mbalit project, as of 2022.

Bensouda called waste management his number-one priority as mayor. KMC developed a five-year waste management plan (2017 to 2021) in consultation with the community and the private sector. It focussed on public awareness, new waste-sorting strategies, expanded household waste collection, job creation, and partnerships with informal waste management. It created the Mbalit project, the first household-waste-collection programme in the Gambia. With a grant from the European Union, Bensouda launched the Kanifing Environmental Transformation Programme (KETP), which donated waste-collection equipment to the initiative. It set up 10 communal skip bins and reduced the number of illegal dumpsites from 65 to 17. The programme's success improved the government's image.

=== Transport ===
The Gambia Transport Service Company, which runs international buses to Dakar and Bissau, has a bus depot in Kanifing. Bensouda's government has planned an urban bus system with 50 buses and 20 routes.

== Education ==
Kanifing has most of the country's tertiary education institutes, including the University of The Gambia, the American International University West Africa, the Gambia Technical Training Institute, and the Management Development Institute.

Construction of Kanifing's library began on 18 August 2022. It will be the country's first municipal library. It is an initiative of Bensouda and the KETP, with funding from Peterborough City Council in England. The project cost 45 million dalasi.

== Sport ==
The Kanifing Municipal Sports Committee (KM Sport) is one of the Gambia's seven regional sports organisations. Its chairperson, who is elected from the chairpersons of its constituent district sport committees, represents Kanifing in the National Sports Council.

== Sister cities ==
Kanifing is twinned with:

- Madison, Wisconsin, United States
- Memphis, Tennessee, United States
- Mbao, Senegal

Madison has provided funding for Kanifing's garbage trucks and its public library.
