= Latri Kunda =

Coordinates: 13°27′N 16°41′W

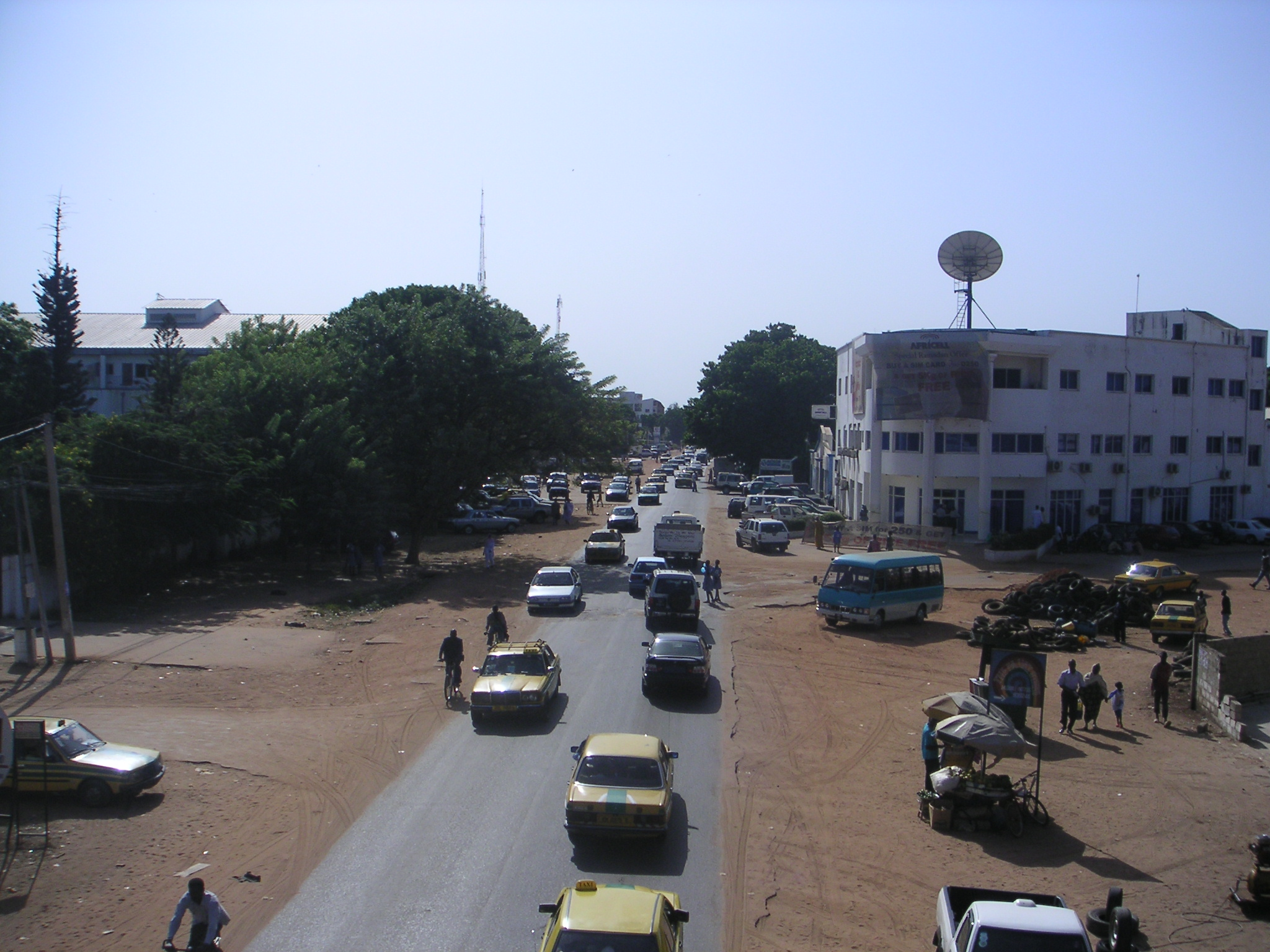
Kairaba Avenue in Latri Kunda, near Westfield.

Latri Kunda (spelling variation: Latrikunda, name variant: Latri Kunda Yiringan Ya or Latrikunda Yiri Nganya) is part of the Kanifing District, and a suburb of Sere Kunda (or Serekunda) in The Gambia.

The district is located in the center of Serekunda. In the 1993 census, Latri Kunda was listed as a separate town with 22,902 inhabitants.

== History and toponymy ==
Latri Kunda takes its name from Lat Kumba Lô (full name: Latir Kumba Lô) — a Serer noble and friend of one of Sayerr Jobe's sons (founder of Sere Kunda) who was persuaded to move to the Gambia from Senegal in return for a piece of land. After moving to the Gambia, he was given Latri Kunda by the noble Jobe family. Thus, Lat Kumba became lamane of Latri Kunda.

== Geography ==
The Kanifing District is adjacent to the northeast. The border is defined by the Kairaba Avenue which runs from northwest to southeast. In the south, Latri Kunda is limited by Sayerr Jobe Avenue, south is Serekunda District. Dippa Kunda is located southwest, the border is defined by several side roads. To the west lies Manjai Kunda, where Kotu forms the border. In the northwest Latri Kunda reaches up to the Bertil Harding Highway and borders on Bakau New Town (or Fajara). In part, an area south of the Bertil Harding Highway is still counted as part of Fajara.

Latri Kunda is a cosmopolitan area with loads of restaurants, shops and bars. Kairaba Avenue which runs within the vicinity of this suburb is a well known road in the country. It is where almost all of the Gambia's telecommunication towers such as Africell, QCell, Comium, and several other banks are headquartered, including the American Embassy. Gamtel, the nation's telecommunication company also has an office on Kairaba Avenue - near Westfield.

The "Big Tree" (Goye bu maak), a massive silk cotton tree on the west of Mosque Road is also located in Latri Kunda, next to Latri Kunda Market. It is a meeting point.
