= Monkey Park =

Monkey Park may refer to a number of different reserves or parks hosting monkeys:

- Ubud Monkey Forest, Bali
- Jigokudani Monkey Park, Yamanouchi, Nagano Prefecture, Japan
- Iwatayama Monkey Park, Kyoto, Japan.
- Japan Monkey Park, located on the Monkey Park Monorail Line, in Inuyama, Aichi Pref., Japan
- Bijilo Forest Park, The Gambia
- Takasakiyama Natural Zoological Garden, Ōita City, Ōita Prefecture, Japan

== See also ==
- MonkeyParking, a mobile app for parking in San Francisco
- Category:Monkey parks
