= American International University West Africa =

University in Serekunda, The Gambia

Coordinates: 13.463290°N 16.673883°W

- Type: Private
- Established: January 2011; 15 years ago
- Location: Serekunda, The Gambia
- Campus: Fajara, Serekunda
- Website: aiu.edu.gm

American International University West Africa is a medical school in Serekunda, The Gambia. Established in January 2011, the university offers medical programs leading to a Doctor of Medicine (MD) Degree. The curriculum is based on American medical school systems. The university is open to students from Africa. AIU Health Science Center consists of 5 colleges: College of Medicine (6 year Program), College of Dentistry (5 year program), College of Pharmacy (5 year program), College of Nursing (3 year program), College of Health Professionals: MLT (2 year program). AIUWA admits students three times a year. The first campus is located at 89 Kairaba Avenue, KSMD, Fajara, The Gambia. 201 students from 14 countries enrolled in 2013. A new campus has been constructed at Kanifing Institutional Area. 120,000 square foot campus houses State of Art classrooms, Laboratories, Library, Conference rooms and other Students facilities. Construction of the new campus started in April 2013 and was completed by end of 2016. The school is accredited by National Accreditation and Quality Assurance Agency (NAQAA) which was established in 2015. Most of the lecturers in the school are professors who hold PhDs and Masters degrees.
