= London Corner =

London Corner ركن لندن
- Suburb of Serekunda
- Location of London Corner
- Coordinates: 13°25′51.6″N 16°39′59.5″W
- Country: The Gambia
- Local Government Area: Kanifing
- Established: 1994
- Time zone: UTC+0

London Corner is a suburb of Serekunda, the biggest city in The Gambia.
