= Momodou Lamin Jallow =

Momodou Lamin Jallow may refer to:

- J Hus (born 1995), British rapper, singer, and songwriter
- Momodou Lamin Jallow (soccer) (born 1996), Gambian-born American footballer
