= Ousman Joof =

Gambian footballer

Personal information
- Full name: Ousman Joof
- Date of birth: 28 February 2000 (age 26)
- Place of birth: Kololi, The Gambia
- Height: 1.73 m (5 ft 8 in)
- Position: Right midfielder

Youth career
- –2019: Superstars Academy

Senior career*
Years	Team	Apps	(Gls)
2017–2019	Superstars Academy		
2017–2019	→ Marimoo (loan)		
2019–2021	Trayal Kruševac	52	(5)
2023	Trayal Kruševac	3	(0)

International career
- Gambia U20
- * Club domestic league appearances and goals as of 25 June 2023

Ousman Joof (born 28 February 2000) is a Gambian professional footballer who plays as a right midfielder. He has previously played in the Serbian First League.

== Club career ==
Born in Kololi, Joof started playing in Gambia at the Superstars Academy. In the summer of the 2019–20 season, he signed with Serbian club Trayal Kruševac.

== International career ==
Before arriving to Serbia, Joof had already been member of the Gambia U20.
