= Momodou Lamin Jallow (soccer) =

Gambian footballer

Momodou Jallow
Personal information
- Full name: Momodou Lamin Jallow
- Date of birth: 17 September 1996 (age 30)
- Place of birth: Serrekunda, The Gambia
- Height: 1.95 m (6 ft 5 in)
- Position: Forward

Team information
- Current team: Ljubić Prnjavor (on loan from Borac Banja Luka)
- Number: 26

Youth career
- 2014: Kalonji Soccer Academy

Senior career*
Years	Team	Apps	(Gls)
2018–2019	Farul Constanța	19	(6)
2019–2020	Dacia Unirea Brăila	12	(3)
2020–	Borac Banja Luka	3	(0)
2020–	→ Ljubić Prnjavor (loan)	8	(1)
- * Club domestic league appearances and goals as of 14 November 2020

Momodou Lamin Jallow (born 17 September 1996) is a Gambian professional footballer who plays as a forward for First League of RS club Ljubić Prnjavor, on loan from Borac Banja Luka.

== Career ==
Born in Serrekunda, Jallow has played for Kalonji Soccer Academy and their youth team KSA PRO-PROFILE in the United Premier Soccer League. In 2018 he signed his first professional contract with Farul Constanța.

In 2019, he joined Dacia Unirea Brăila.

== Personal life ==
Jallow came to the United States as a refugee from Serrekunda in The Gambia.
