= Radio 1 FM (The Gambia) =

Serekunda; Gambia
- Frequency: 102.1 MHz

Radio 1 FM 102.10 MHz is a long-established Gambian independent radio station based in Serrekunda. The station's popular programmes included 'Sunday Newshour' and 'Lovers Night'.

The station was founded by veteran broadcaster George Christensen (died 2016) who was considered the doyen of Gambian community radio. The Radio station was victim of an arson attack on August 10, 2001 in which Christensen and a night watchman were injured while trying to extinguish the fire. One of the station's journalist's houses was also set on fire. Radio 1 FM was among radio stations targeted in government clampdowns on journalists, with Christensen being arrested and taken to NIA headquarters October 23, 2001, in the days following the Gambian presidential election, 2001.
