= Serekunda =

City in the Gambia

- City
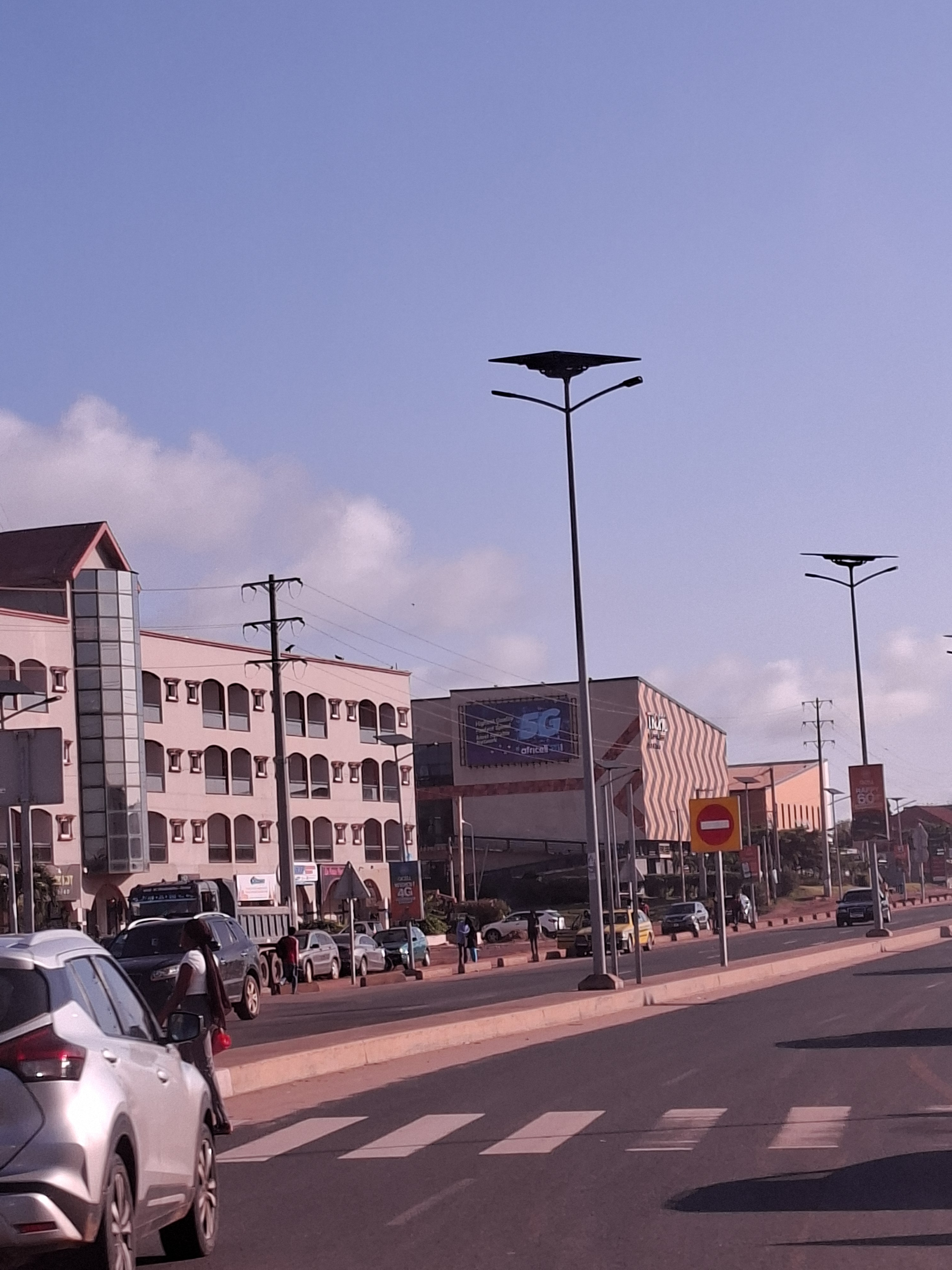
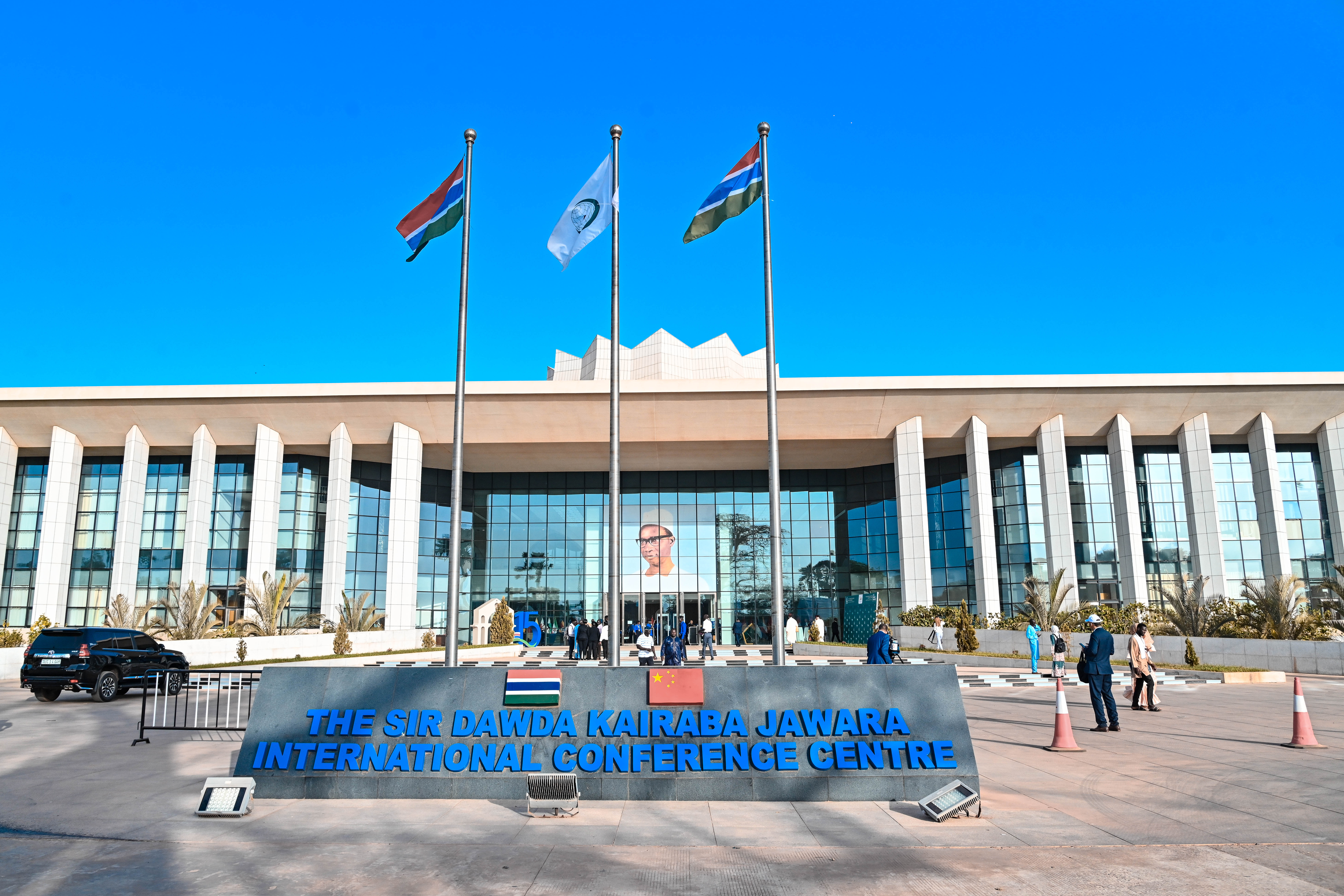
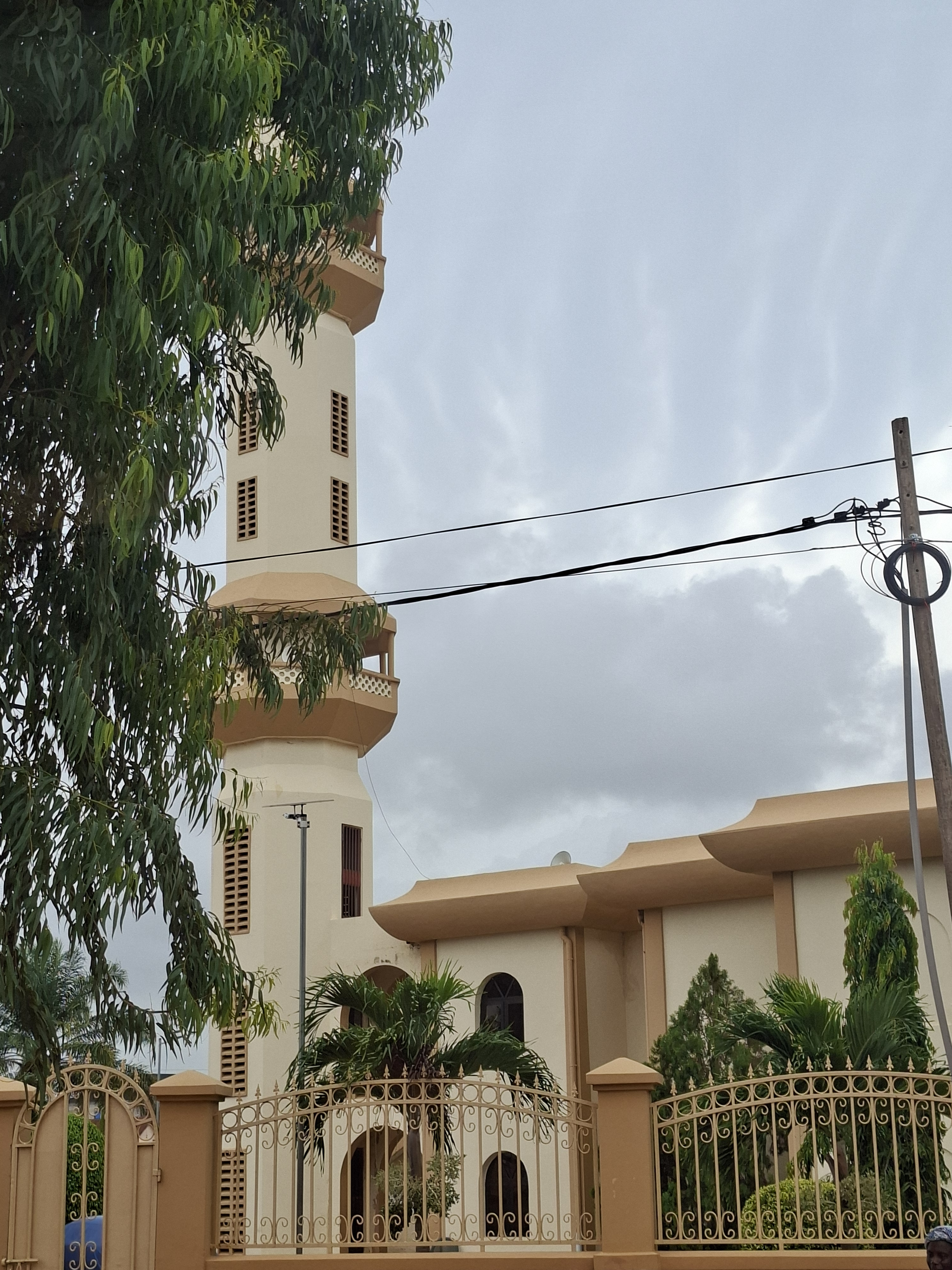
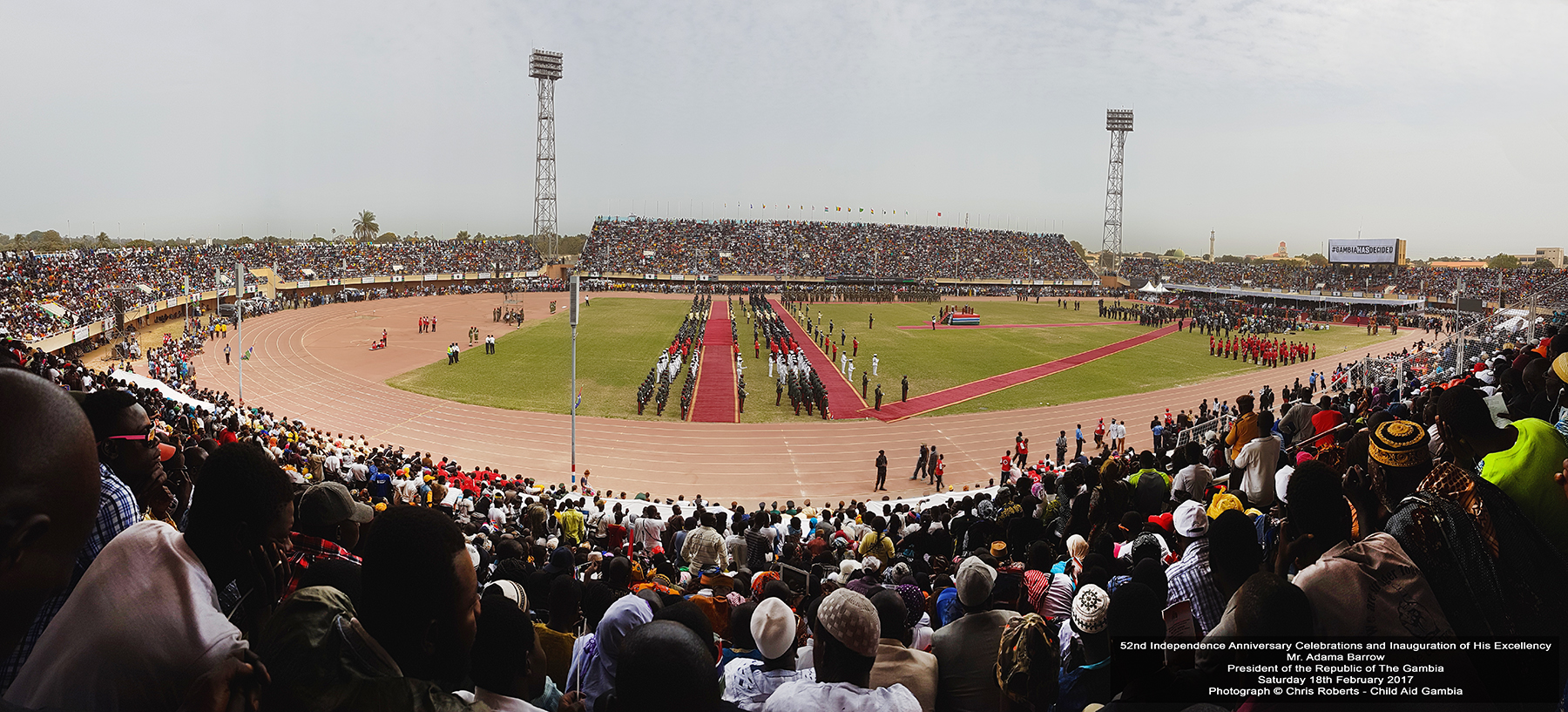
- Senegambia Roundabout on OIC Road Sir Dawda Kairaba Jawara International Conference Center Pipeline Mosque Independence Stadium (Bakau) (Pre renovation)

- Location in the Gambia
- Coordinates: 13°26′42″N 16°40′30″W
- Country: Gambia
- Division: Kanifing
- District: Kanifing
- Founder: Sayerr Jobe
- Named for: Sayerr Jobe

Population (2013)
  - City: 19,944
  - Urban (Kanifing Municipal Council): 382,096
- Time zone: UTC±00:00 (GMT)

Serekunda (or Serrekunda; Wolof pronunciation: [sɛːɾɛkuⁿd̺ɐ]) is a major city and the largest metropolitan area in The Gambia. It is situated close to the Atlantic coast, on the Gambia River, near the capital, Banjul. Serekunda and Banjul form an urban area known as the Kombos, with about half of the population of the Gambia.

Serekunda was named for Sayerr Jobe, who founded it in the 19th century. It merged with several villages into a larger urban area. Banjul's growth has been restricted due to being a small island, leading to Serekunda growing in population and businesses moving there from Banjul. Serekunda has been the site of political protests, and candidates from several parties have won seats. Since the 1980s, Serekunda has been a regional centre of the Tablighi Jamaat religious movement.

Serekunda's market is the largest in the country. Along the coast, the Senegambia Strip is a popular place for foreign tourists, including sex tourists. Gambian wrestling is a popular sport, and the city has multiple football stadiums.

== History ==
=== Foundation and toponymy ===
Serekunda was founded in the second half of the 19th century by Sayerr Jobe, a Wolof man from Koki in the Kingdom of Cayor, in what is now northern Senegal. Jobe, whose family was part of the royal class, left Koki due to a power struggle. He went upriver to Niumi, then Banjul, before establishing Serekunda. Sukuta was the only nearby settlement, and the area was a thick forest. He delegated power to his seven sons before dying in 1896. The name 'Serekunda' is a corruption of "Sayerr Jobe Kunda". The street where his home was located was named Sayerr Jobe Avenue.

Several villages, including Dippakunda, Latrikunda, and Serekunda, grew into the city of Serekunda. Touray Kunda was established by one of the first settler families.

=== Pre-independence ===
In the 1960 Gambian parliamentary election, the United Party (UP)'s candidate for the Kombo West seat (now in Serekunda) was Ebrima D. N'Jie, a retired lawyer who had sometimes acted as party leader in place of his half-brother, Pierre Sarr N'Jie. The Democratic Congress Alliance (DCA) ran Reverend J. C. Faye, the party leader who was barred from running in his home of New Town. H. O. Semega-Janneh, a local member of the Legislative Council, ran as an independent and won.

In the 1962 election, the People's Progressive Party (PPP) supported the DCA's candidate in Serekunda. Semega-Janneh, who had joined the UP, was reelected. The unsuccessful PPP candidate in Kombo West, Famara Wassa Touray, was arrested amid electoral unrest.

=== Post-independence ===
In the 1960s, Serekunda and Bakau expanded as satellite towns of Bathurst (now Banjul), forming a "Mandinka belt". In the 1966 election, Semega-Janneh was the PPP candidate for Serekunda. The UP chose Gibou M. Jagne. Jagne won with 68% of the vote. In the 1972 election, the PPP chose youth leader Omar A. Jallow to challenge Jagne. Jagne was one of only three UP candidates to win.

After the National Convention Party (NCP) was founded in 1975, Serekunda and neighbouring Bakau were the towns with the highest support for it outside of the rural Badibbu area. Though the NCP was primarily a Mandinka party, it, as well as the PPP, had wide support across ethnic groups in Serekunda. It gained support from Badibbu migrants in Serekunda. Jagne joined the NCP.

In 1977, the Serekunda parliamentary constituency was split in two. In that year's election, the PPP selected Jallow for the Serekunda East seat and Abdoulie A. N'Jie for Serekunda West. The NCP selected Jagne for Serekunda West. Serekunda West elected the NCP and Serekunda East elected the PPP. Both races were close.

In the 1979 local elections, the Kanifing Urban District Council had eight seats won by the PPP and the remaining four won by the NCP. Serekunda's vote in this election was 63% in favour of PPP. In the 1982 Gambian general election, the PPP won both seats in Serekunda, with 63% of the vote, and the NCP kept a narrow hold of Bakau. The result in Serekunda West was influenced by a local man who had switched his support from the NCP to the PPP.

The leaders of the 1981 attempted coup held covert meetings in Serekunda. Many young people in the city supported the coup due to disillusionment with the political system and living standards. Jagne was arrested on charges of supporting the coup and was released one week before the 1982 election. The NCP lost support in the election due to the coup, and Jagne lost to N'Jie of the PPP in Serekunda West. In the 1987 election, Jagne retook the seat. Halifa Sallah ran in Serekunda East under the newly established People's Democratic Organisation for Independence and Socialism (PDOIS), which only ran in five races. He got 9.8% of the vote. In the 1992 election, N'Jie defeated Jagne. Sallah ran again with 11% of the vote.

A 1982 survey found that less than 10% of workers in Serekunda were in unions. In 1985, Serekunda's population was estimated to be 70,000. Many residents worked in Banjul. About 3% of residents were employed as farmers, and others raised crops or livestock, unlike in Banjul.

=== Jammeh and Barrow administrations ===
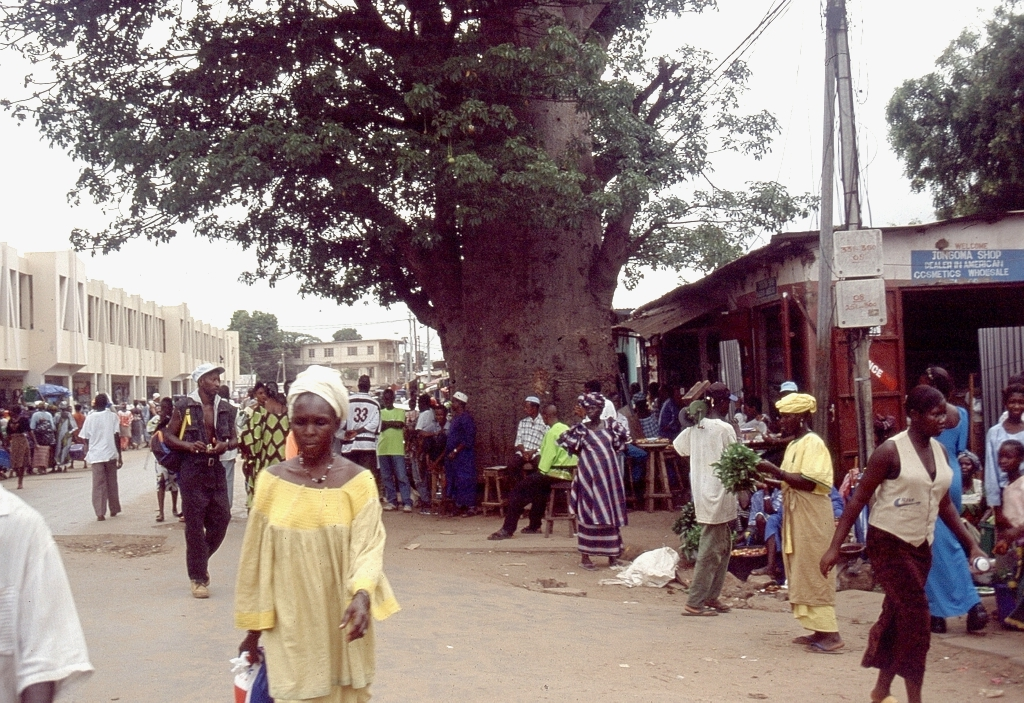
Serekunda in 1999

When Jammeh's government redistributed the parliamentary constituencies, it used chieftaincy districts rather than population, which led to more populated areas, especially Serekunda, being underrepresented. In the 1997 Gambian parliamentary election, the first after Jammeh took power, the Serekunda East seat was won by the little-known Fabakary Jatta in an upset against Sallah. Sallah did not contest the result. Sallah later held the Serekunda Central seat until he lost it to the Alliance for Patriotic Reorientation and Construction in the 2007 election.

In March 1996, students at the Muslim High School in Serekunda were involved in a riot against Yahya Jammeh's military rule, which led to its principal, Pa Modou N'jie, being fired. In October 2009, United Democratic Party (UDP) activist Femi Peters was arrested for organising an anti-Jammeh rally in Serekunda. He was sentenced to one year of prison.

In 2015, the Kanifing municipal government renamed Sayerr Jobe Avenue after the mayor, Yankuba Colley. The decision was criticised by Jobe's heirs, who thought it ignored his legacy, and other residents, who found it unnecessary to adapt to a new name.

In December 2016, after Jammeh rejected his loss of the election, the military deployed in Banjul and Serekunda. The retaliatory ECOWAS military intervention in the Gambia included the deployment of Nigerian forces in Serekunda and Brikama. On 21 January 2017, when Jammeh left the country, a crowd celebrated at Westfield Junction in Serekunda. The management of emigrants who returned to the country post-Jammeh was concentrated in Serekunda. A group of returnees who had been stuck in transit in Libya stoned the International Organization for Migration's office in Serekunda, feeling frustrated that the government had not kept its promise to reintegrate them.

After incumbent Adama Barrow won the 2021 Gambian presidential election, the UDP candidate Ousainou Darboe contested the result. A group of supporters gathered at his house in Serekunda and were dispersed with tear gas, which was condemned by the National Human Rights Commission.

== Geography ==
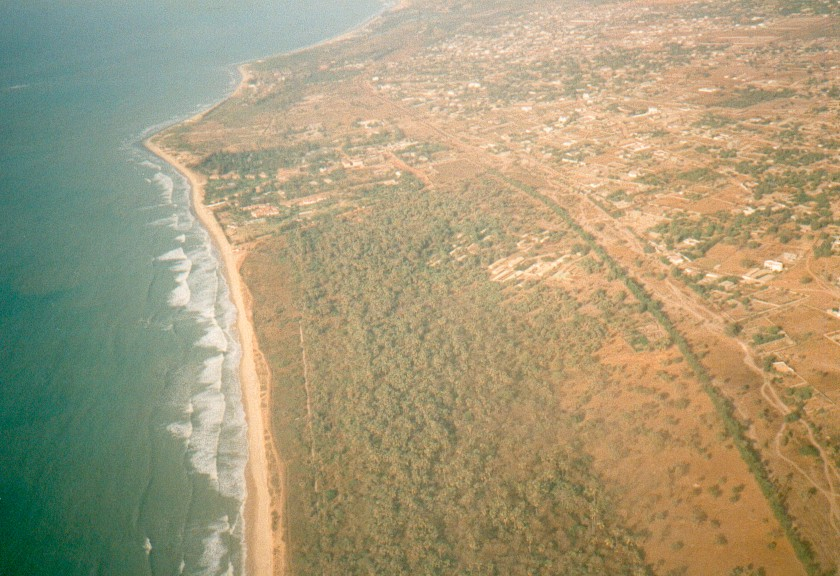
Serekunda skyline in 1997, above Bijilo Forest Park.

Serekunda and Banjul are located 18 kilometres (11 mi) from each other, on the coast of the Atlantic Ocean, at the mouth of the Gambia River. Serekunda is the most populous urban agglomeration in the Gambia. It includes the towns of London Corner, Dippakunda, Bundung, and Tallinding and is near the coastal towns of Kotu and Kololi. The conurbation of Serekunda and Banjul, known as the Kombos, is the only major urban area in the Gambia.

The expansion of Banjul has been limited as it is an island surrounded by mangrove swamps, leading to Serekunda gaining its overflow population and some of its institutions. In the 2000s, offices in Banjul moved to more modern offices with better infrastructure in Serekunda. Bakau expanded from a fishing village to part of the urban sprawl of Serekunda.

=== Climate ===
Serekunda is near the Sahara Desert. It is cloudless on 80% of days. Its total ozone amount ranges from 225 to 329 Dobson units, with a mean of 268.1±15.97 Dobson units, as of 1993 to 1996. Its ozone peak is during the rainy season, from June to October. The average daily erythemal ultraviolet dose is 5 kilojoules per square metre, with more variation during the rainy season.

== Demographics ==
Historical population
| Year | Pop. | ±% |
|---|---|---|
| 1993 | 18,901 | — |
| 2003 | 19,292 | +2.1% |
| 2013 | 19,944 | +3.4% |

=== Population ===
As of the 2013 Population and Housing Census, the settlement of Serekunda has 19,944 people, including 9,758 women. Kanifing, which includes Serekunda, has a population of 382,096, including 189,679 males and 192,417 females. It has 67,119 households, with an average household size of 5.70. The urban agglomeration of Kanifing and Serekunda has about half of the country's population, as of 2018.

=== Languages ===
Serekunda is ethnically and linguistically diverse. The Wolof language serves as a lingua franca in Serekunda and across the west of the country. Nearly all signage is in Gambian English. Nearly all residents speak either Wolof or Mandinka.

=== Immigration ===
People from villages come to the Kombos to study, work, run small businesses, or join businesses of relatives. On average, these villagers stay for 2.2 years, as of 2010. Serekunda is an ethnic enclave of Soninke people, including many from the town of Sabi. Some Soninke migrants move their families to Serekunda. In the 1970s and 1980s, many wealthy Soninke people chose to move to the Kombos for business reasons.

In 2003, after the Sierra Leonean Civil War, thousands of Sierra Leoneans lived in Serekunda and Bakau. Most identified as migrants rather than refugees, so they did not receive UNHCR aid; fewer than 200 lived in the Koudoum Refugee Camp. Many of the migrants had formal education and sought skilled jobs. About fifteen Sierra Leonean youth clubs were formed in Serekunda, mostly affiliated with the politically influential Sierra Leonean Union (SLENU), formed in the 1980s. A Sierra Leonean Tablighi Jamaat centre was formed.

== Religion ==
=== Islam ===
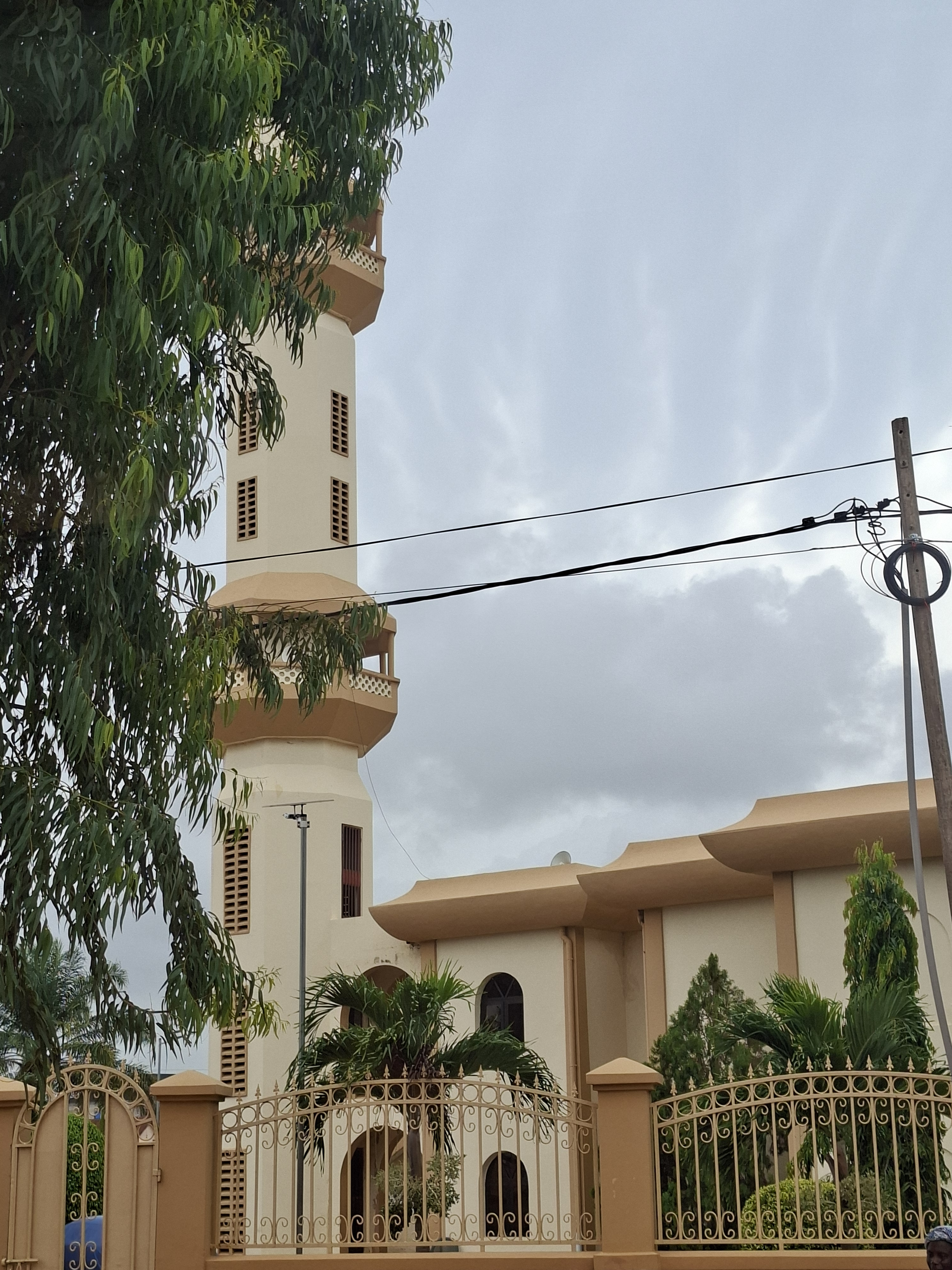
Serekunda Mosque

The Serekunda Mosque is the oldest mosque in the city. It is on Sayerr Jobe Avenue, across from the site of Jobe's home. The Pipeline Mosque is on Kairaba Avenue. It has capacity for 3,000 people and a 33-metre-tall minaret. It was founded by Alhaji Daddy Jobe and opened in 1990 as the Pipeline neighbourhood grew.

The Islamic Solidarity Association of West Africa functions as a non-governmental organisation that conducts foreign affairs, and it has built a medical centre. In 2000, Soninke religious leaders established the Imam Malik Institute, a madrasa and boarding school that teaches the sunnah. It has gradually expanded since its establishment, with teachers who studied in the Middle East.

==== Tablighi Jamaat movement ====
Serekunda is a centre of the Tablighi Jamaat Islamic movement. The Markaz (transl. Centre), a dawah centre in the Bundung neighbourhood, is the country's main centre of the Jamaat. The Markaz is open to the public and congregates on Thursdays. Pakistani preachers preach at the compound. It is a two-storey building with an adjacent mosque that can seat 2,000 people, surrounded by barbed wire. It has a reputation for being secretive. Adherents from across West Africa convene in the city. Gambians who convert to the Jamaat often move away from their families to Serekunda. The term "Markaz" is used to refer to the mosque and the movement.

Tablighi missionaries from South Asia first came to the Gambia in the 1960s but were not successful until the early 1990s. Imam Karamoko Dukureh, the son of a marabout from the village of Gambissara, established the Jamaat in the Gambia after studying in Saudi Arabia. He returned to Gambissara in the 1980s and began to build a mosque with foreign donations. The villagers, who did not want a second mosque, got the government to intervene in 1993. Once Jammeh took power, his government approved the mosque, but he then prohibited it to gain support from village elders. The government demolished the mosque and arrested four followers. Followers bought land in Bundung and built a compound that Dukureh moved into. The compound was replaced with a brick building that gradually expanded. Dukureh served as the imam of the Markaz until his death in 2000. As women have not been permitted to attend regular services since 2003, five homes of women who adhere to the Jamaat host Sunday services.

=== Minority religions ===
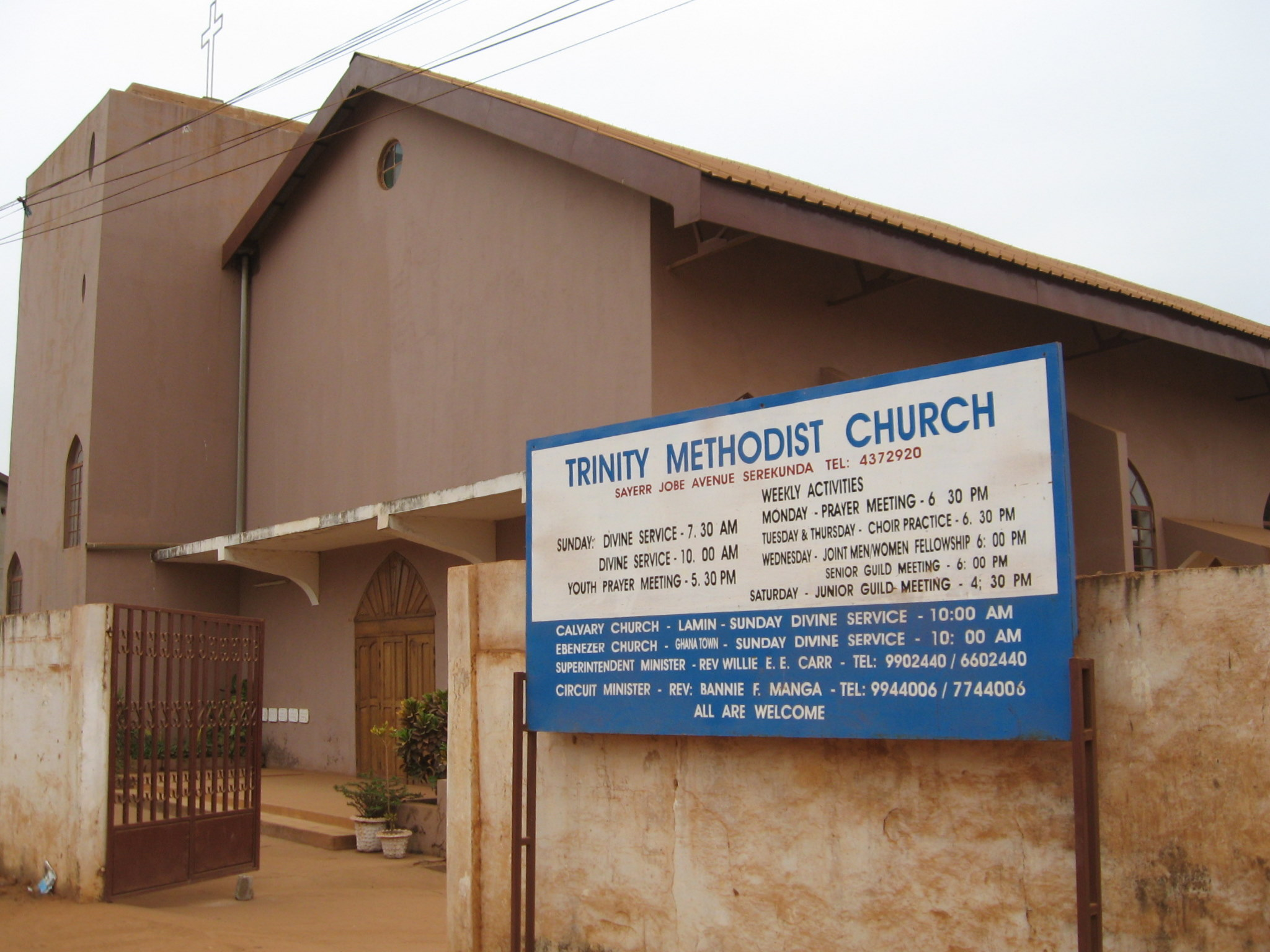
Trinity Methodist Church

Churches include the Trinity Methodist Church and Saint Therese's Catholic Church. After the Baháʼí missionary Fariborz Roozbehyan arrived in the Gambia in February 1954, a Spiritual Assembly was established in Serekunda.

== Economy ==
According to the 2013 economic census, Kanifing had 14,924 business establishments, the highest of any local government area and 40.3% of the country's total. The districts of Serekunda West, Serekunda East, and Serekunda Central respectively had 5,051, 3,547, and 3,198 establishments.

Residents of nearby villages such as Tujereng and Jambanjally farm on the weekends and have weekday jobs in Serekunda. Some vendors at Serekunda Market are farmers. Serekunda and other Gambian cities have informal trade networks that smuggle products across The Gambia–Senegal border.

=== Serekunda Market ===
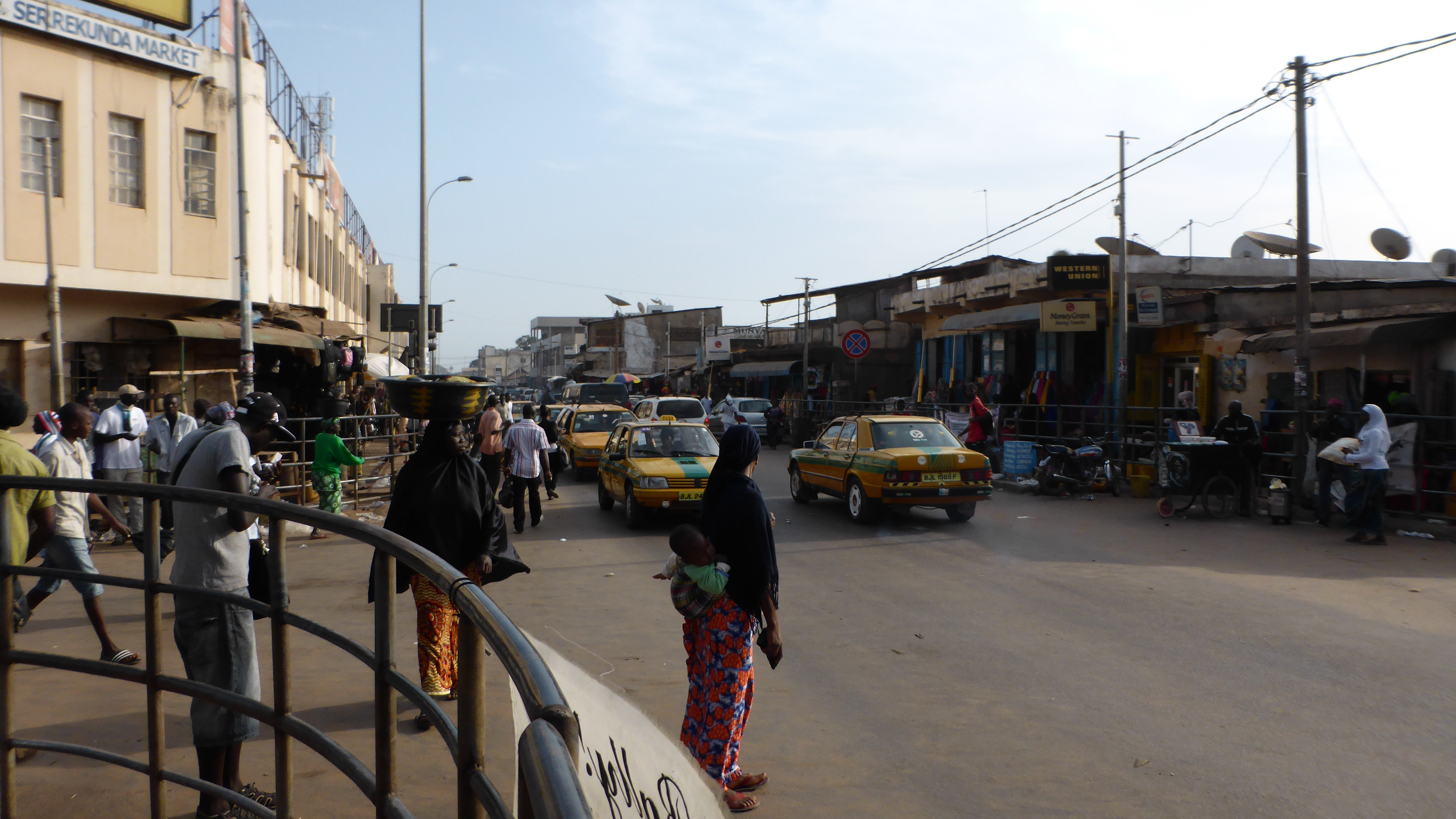
The Serekunda market

Serekunda Market, also called Sandika, is in the centre of the city. It is the largest market in the country. Traders have sold produce there since the early nineteenth century. The market expanded from a group of women selling fish and vegetables by a dirt road.

The market has many vendors of vegetables and fish. It is a popular place to buy batik. It is located alongside businesses including an electronics repair "black market".

Vendors at the market have said it is too small, and some cannot secure space there. They have complained about floods during the rainy season causing lower patronage. Expired products are frequently sold. Solar-powered cold storage was introduced in 2020, funded by the Kanifing Municipal Council and the High Commission of the United Kingdom. As of 2024, it is not operational.

== Tourism ==
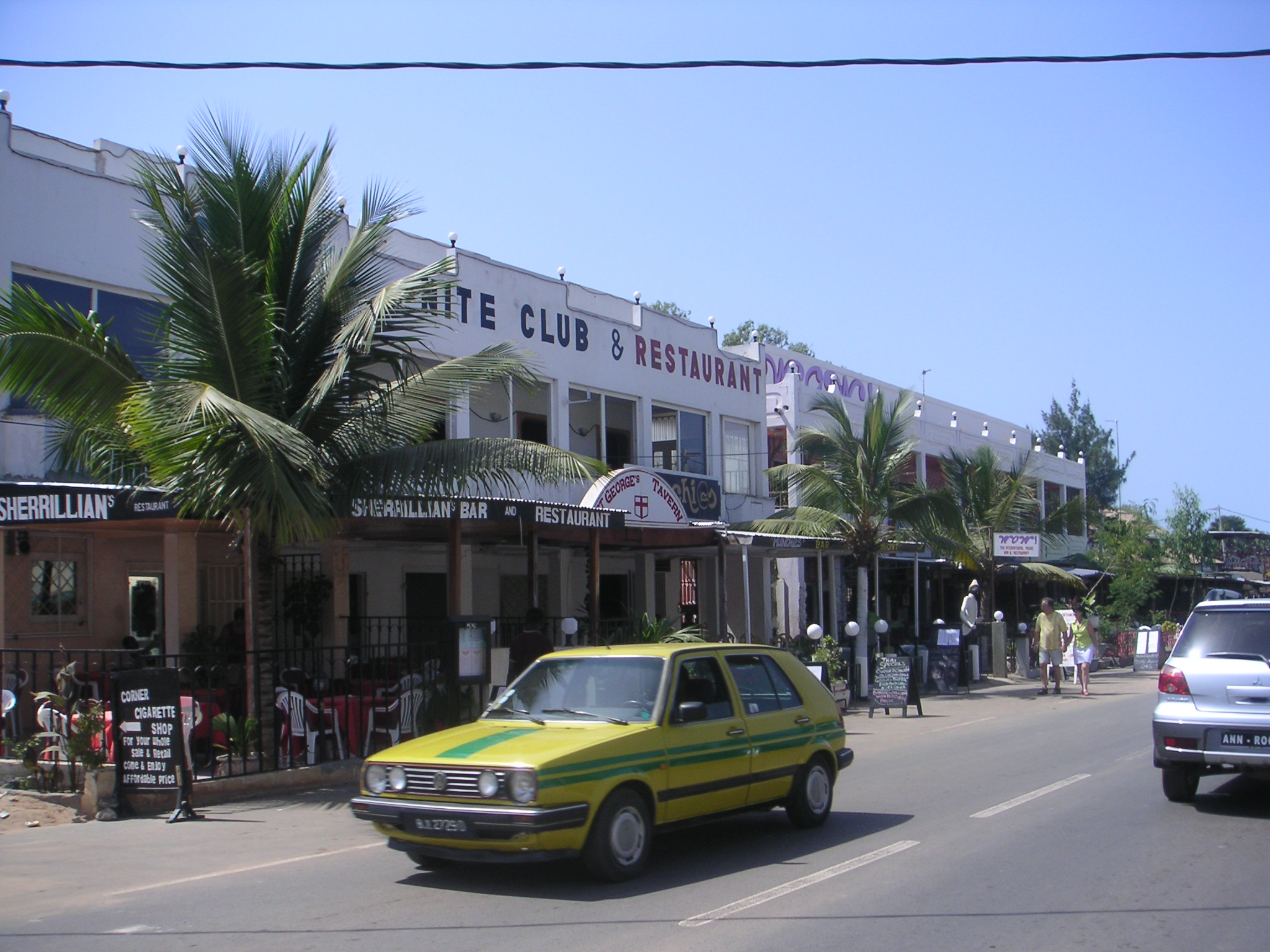
A nightclub on the Senegambia Strip

The Senegambia Strip is a short road that contains many restaurants and music venues. It is the country's most popular site for beachside entertainment. It receives tourists from wealthy countries, whose spending is a major contributor to the economy.

The Serekunda–Banjul area has twenty hotels where 90% of tourists stay, and 84% of tourists book through tour operators, as of 2008. A beachfront area of Kololi has popular luxury hotels, including the Kairaba Hotel and the Senegambia Hotel.

The Senegambia Strip has a large market for sex tourism. Young men looking for money, known as "bumsters", provide sex for tourists. Residents of Serekunda believe sex tourism has become a norm and pedophilic activities harm local youth. Many are concerned that European tourists take advantage of economic inequality by persuading poor Gambians to have sex for money. Politicians have proposed subsidising new accommodations or increasing penalties for foreign sex tourists.

== Infrastructure ==
=== Transportation ===
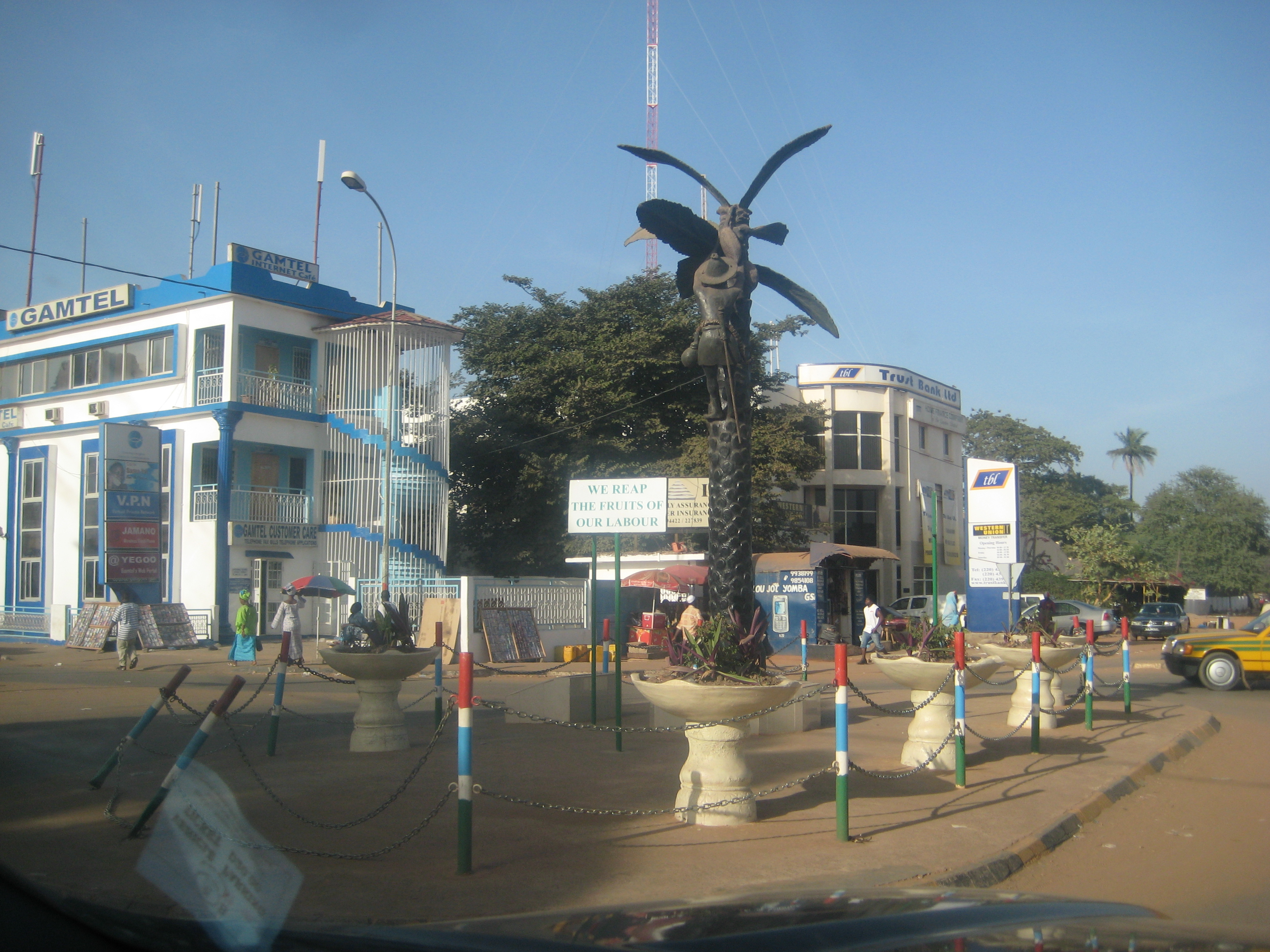
Westfield Junction

The Banjul-Serekunda Highway is a four-lane highway from Westfield to Banjul that crosses Denton Bridge. The highway receives traffic from thousands of residents who commute to work in Banjul. Serekunda is linked to Banjul by a public bus service and private taxis.

Westfield Junction is a busy intersection at the terminus of the highway to Banjul. From the intersection, drivers can go to coastal Serekunda or continue inland. Sayerr Jobe Avenue goes from Westfield to London Corner via central Serekunda. It is a shopping street with expensive properties. It has heavy traffic between the city and the suburbs.

=== Healthcare ===
Kanifing General Hospital, formerly known as Serrekunda General Hospital, is a tertiary referral hospital. It serves a catchment area of 600,000 people, and it has 114 beds and 2 operating theatres, as of 2021. Its thyroid clinic was established in 2015. The hospital's One Stop Centre takes referrals for psychiatric patients. It is the country's second-biggest trauma centre. It does not have an orthopaedic unit.

Serekunda Health Centre serves a catchment area of 123,000 people in Serekunda and nearby settlements. It is one of the busiest health facilities in the Gambia. It delivers over 300 babies per month. It has an infant welfare clinic. Kanifing General Hospital and the Serekunda Health Centre provide infertility care. Serekunda Health Centre has seen a decrease in malaria cases since 2005.

=== Media and communications ===
The Serekunda Internet Exchange Point began service in July 2014. The exchange, run by OG Financial Services Ltd., provides the internet for a large part of West Africa. Radio 1 FM is an independent commercial radio station established in 1990.

=== Waste management ===
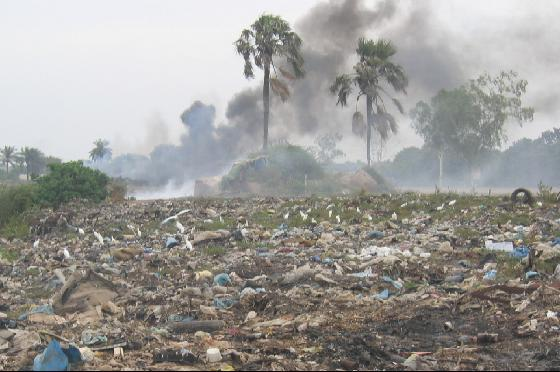
Bakoteh Dump Site

Kanifing's waste is dumped in Bakoteh Dump Site, located on a major road to Serekunda. The Kanifing Municipal Council's Cleansing Services Unit was established in 1984, funded by the World Bank. It is an open dump, and the only method of managing the waste is open burning. It causes air, soil, and groundwater pollution, as well as respiratory infections, methane emissions, and odour. The Kanifing Environmental Transformation Program, launched in 2022, plans to add more rubbish bins and convert Bakoteh Dump Site to a transfer station.

Waste comes from households and Serekunda Market, often picked up from the street. Households widely lack information on proper disposal. In 2017, vendors at the market issued complaints about residents dumping trash in the market. The KMC had stopped their collection of the waste. Waste dumping at the market has caused infestations and discouraged people from shopping there.

== Sport ==
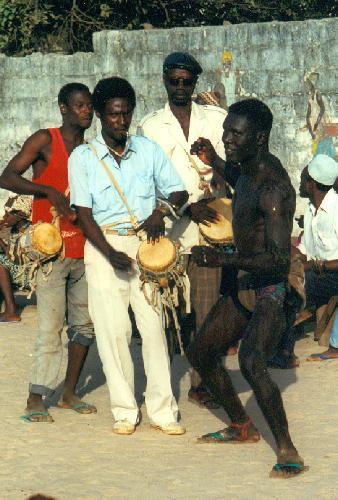
A wrestling venue in Serekunda

=== Wrestling ===
Gambian wrestling was popularised in Serekunda by Bocar Janneh, who founded the B.O. Semega Janneh arena in Dippa Kunda. Semega Promotion, founded by Fatoumata Semega-Janneh, has held matches between local wrestlers at the Serekunda West Mini Stadium. Serekunda Mbolo is a team in the Gambia Wrestling Association. Wrestling matches are popular among foreign tourists.

=== Football ===
Ahead of the country hosting the 2005 African U-17 Championship, the Gambia Football Federation upgraded two stadiums in Serekunda, with support from the government and the FIFA Forward programme. The Gambia National Olympic Committee's Sport Infrastructure Initiative Project completed a mini stadium in Serekunda in 2001, which opened in 2007. The Serekunda East and Serekunda West football stadiums had renovations in 2018.

Two local football clubs, Serrekunda United and Latrikunda United, play in the GFA League Second Division. The Serekunda Central Sports Committee joined the Nawettan in 2011. The Serekunda East Sports Development Organization was the subject of a petition of no confidence on 5 March 2016. Seven teams had been relegated from the Nawettan. It had not held annual general meetings from 2013 to 2015. It was accused of mismanaging and embezzling 1.7 million dalasi. The investigation recommended the suspension of the organisation.
