= Bijilo Forest Park =

Forest park in the Gambia

- IUCN category IV (habitat/species management area)
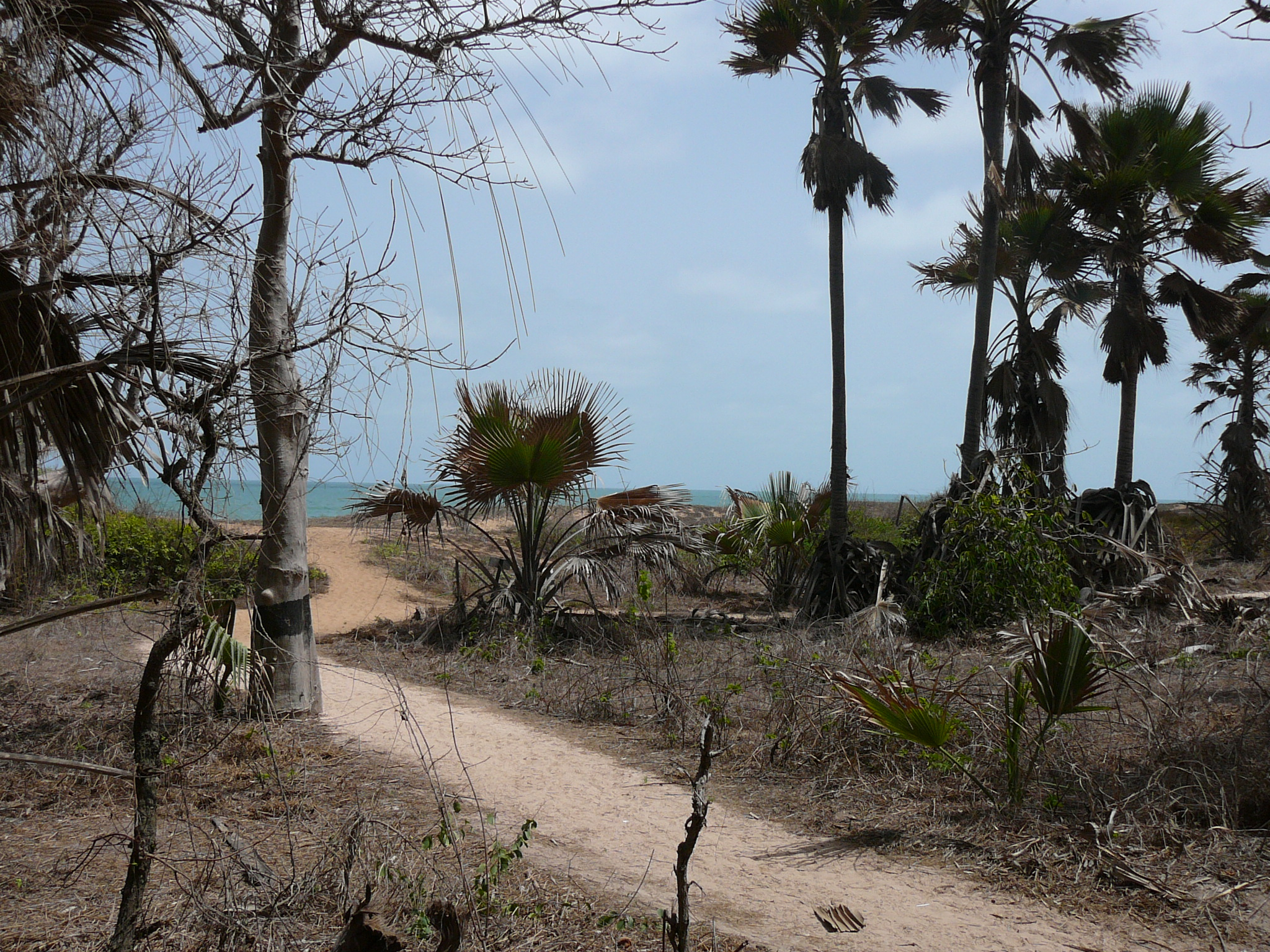
- Interactive map of Bijilo Forest Park
- Location: Western Division Gambia
- Nearest city: Bijilo
- Coordinates: 13°25′58″N 16°43′35″W
- Area: 51.3 ha (127 acres)
- Established: 1982

Bijilo Forest Park, often known as Monkey Park, is a forest park in the Gambia, lying in the coastal zone about 11 km west of Banjul the Kombo Saint Mary District.

== History ==
The species rich Bijilo Forest Park is a fenced woodland which was gazetted in 1952 and covers an area of 51.3 hectares situated on the coast just south of the Senegambia area of Kololi. The park consists of mainly of closed canopy forest with a significant number of Borassus aethiopum palms. The park was opened to the public in 1991 and now receives over 23,000 visitors per year. The park lost part of its reserve status in 2018 during the construction of Sir Dawda Kairaba Jawara International Conference Center.

== Facilities ==
There is a 4.5 km nature trail in the park Park that takes visitors through the varied habitats of forest, coastal scrubland and sand dunes. There is also a 'straight' footpath which cuts through the scrub and forest close to the beach, often referred to as the 'ornithological path'. This route is the one favoured by visiting birdwatchers. There is a small pond within the forest which is maintained to act as a watering hole for many of the forest animals. Signs, benches and a viewing point have been provided for visitors.

== Wildlife ==
Bijilo Forest Park has a diverse fauna of invertebrates, reptiles and mammals. There are troops of green monkeys, Temminck's red colobus, Campbell's mona monkey and patas. The green monkeys have been fed by visitors and this has caused issues, and the park is nominally trying to stop this practice, though park staff still regularly sell visitors peanuts to feed to the monkeys. There is also a population of the nocturnal Senegal bushbaby. Other mammal species which can be seen include the Gambian sun squirrel, African civet, genets, mongooses, brush-tailed porcupine among other smaller, less noticeable species. The forest is also home to a diverse reptile fauna including agama, rainbow and monitor lizards, and some colourful insects and invertebrates including fire ants, dragonflies, termites, butterflies, and the golden silk orb-weaver.

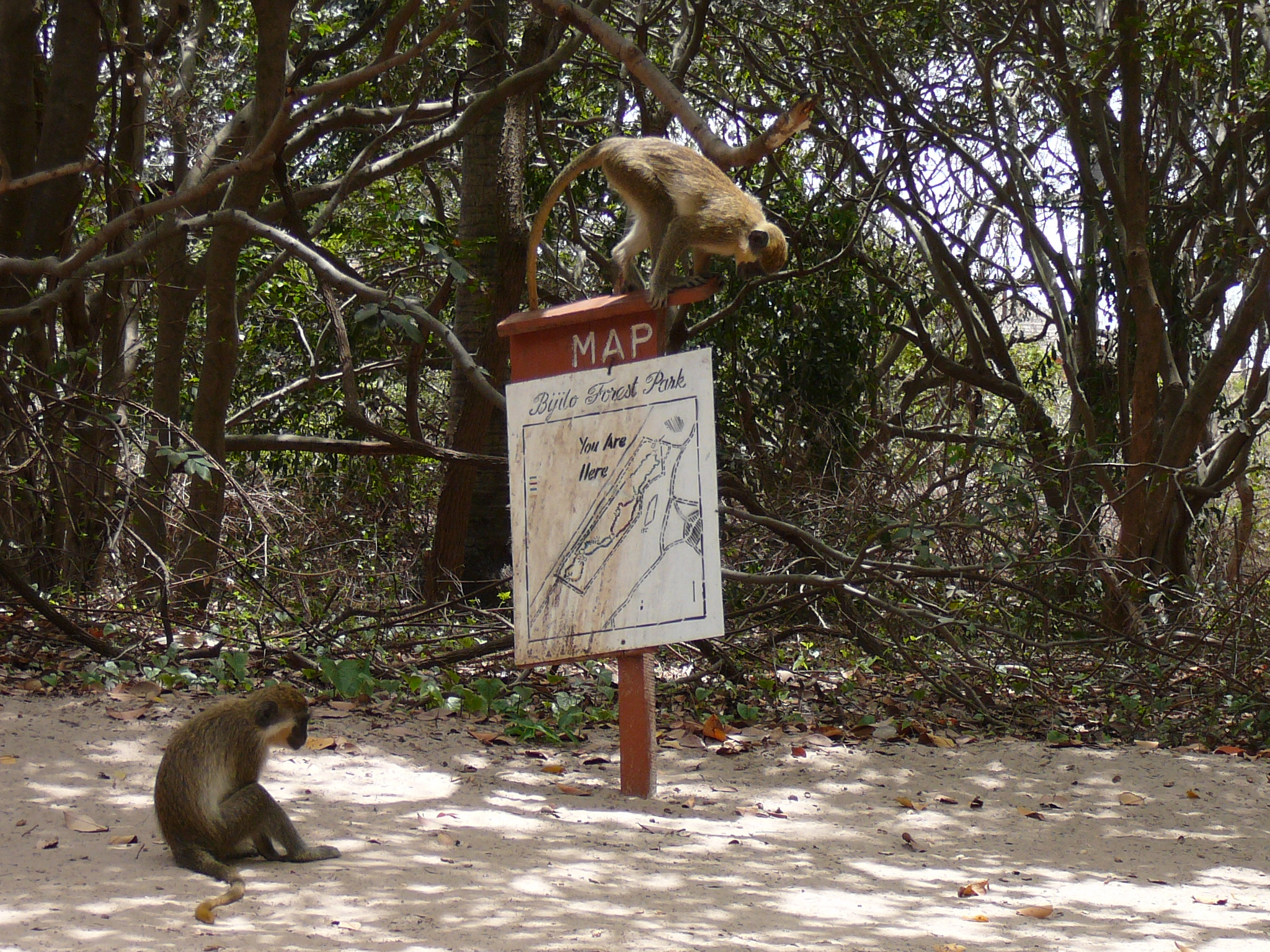

Over 133 bird species have been recorded in the Bijilo Forest Park including such species as the black-necked weaver, red-billed hornbill, greater honeyguide, bearded barbet, oriole warbler, palm-nut vulture and long-tailed nightjar. These and the many other species make the area attractive to the many European birdwatchers who visit the Gambia. The birdwatching is most productive towards the coast where migrants such as Caspian tern and osprey can be seen.
