= Pipeline Mosque =

Mosque in Serekunda, Gambia

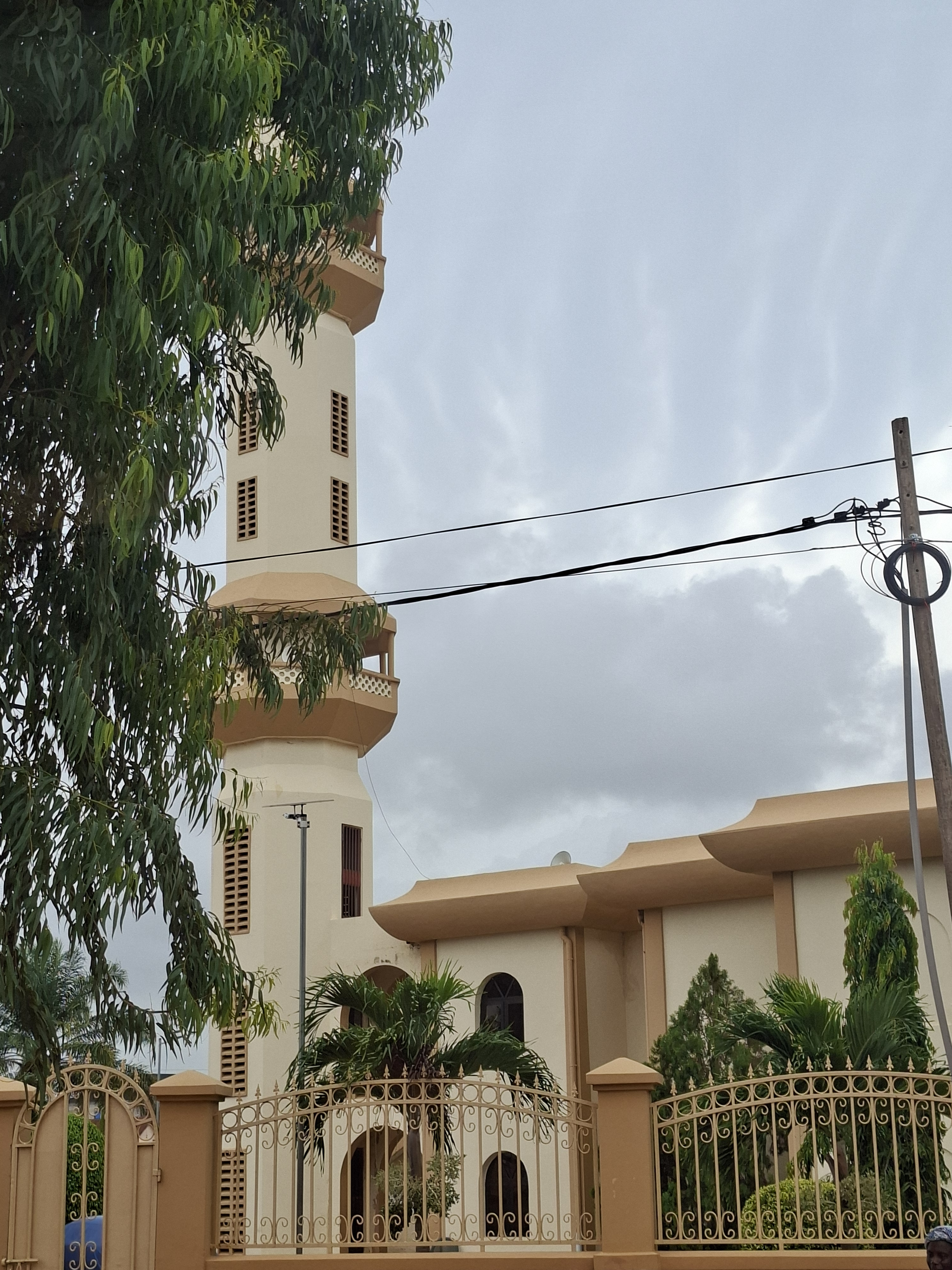

Religion
- Affiliation: Islam

Location
- Municipality: Serekunda
- Country: The Gambia
- Interactive map of Pipeline Mosque
- Coordinates: 13°27′27.838224″N 16°41′5.775431″W

Architecture
- Type: mosque
- Established: 28 February 1990

The Pipeline Mosque is the main mosque of Serekunda, The Gambia.

== Overview ==
Completed on 28 February 1990, the mosque is located on the western side of Kairaba Avenue (former name: Pipeline Road) in Serekunda, close to the Embassy of the US in Banjul.

The external dimensions of the mosque are approximately 30 by 65 metres (98 by 213 ft). The mosque has the features of an Islamic architecture such as a minaret and a facade.
