= MonkeyParking =

- Company type: Private
- Industry: Transportation Network Company (TNC)
- Founded: 2013; 13 years ago
- Founder: Paolo Dobrowolny, Federico Di Legge, Roberto Zanetti
- Headquarters: San Francisco, California, United States
- Number of locations: San Francisco,
- Key people: Paolo Dobrowolny, Federico Di Legge, Roberto Zanetti
- Website: monkeyparking.co

MonkeyParking is a mobile app that allows users of the service to auction parking spaces to other users. The company was founded in 2013 by Paolo Dobrowolny, Federico Di Legge and Roberto Zanetti.

The app (first allowed users to auction off public, city-owned parking spots to the highest bidder) is now focused on private parking spot: property owners are allowed to grant permission for others to park in front of their driveways.

== On-street parking ==
In June 2014, the San Francisco's City Attorney Office issued a cease-and-desist order to stop the company's operations on on-street parking spots in San Francisco, describing the service as "a predatory private market for parking spaces". The City Attorney of San Francisco, Dennis Herrera, regarded the app as breaking a provision of the city's Police Code that specifically prohibits individuals or companies from buying, selling or leasing public on-street parking, and sent a request to the legal department of Apple Inc. to remove the app from Apple's App Store. Defending this usage, CEO Paolo Dobrowolny said "I have the right to tell people if I am about to leave a parking spot, and they have the right to pay me for such information." In July 2014 MonkeyParking suspended its service in San Francisco, and in February 2015 Los Angeles City Council approved an ordinance making it illegal for any company similar to Monkey Parking to establish business within city limits.

In September 2014 MonkeyParking announced plans to launch in Santa Monica. The city's parking administrator was critical of the app, comparing it to "a street bum [who] stands on a space, waves someone in and asks for a tip".

Apps including MonkeyParking have been banned in Boston. A Boston transportation planner said that the apps were doing a "great thing" in bringing more private supply into the public market, giving the example of a church parking lot which could be used by commuters during the week, but that such services "should not be taking a public good and selling it on the private market".
