= Fajara =

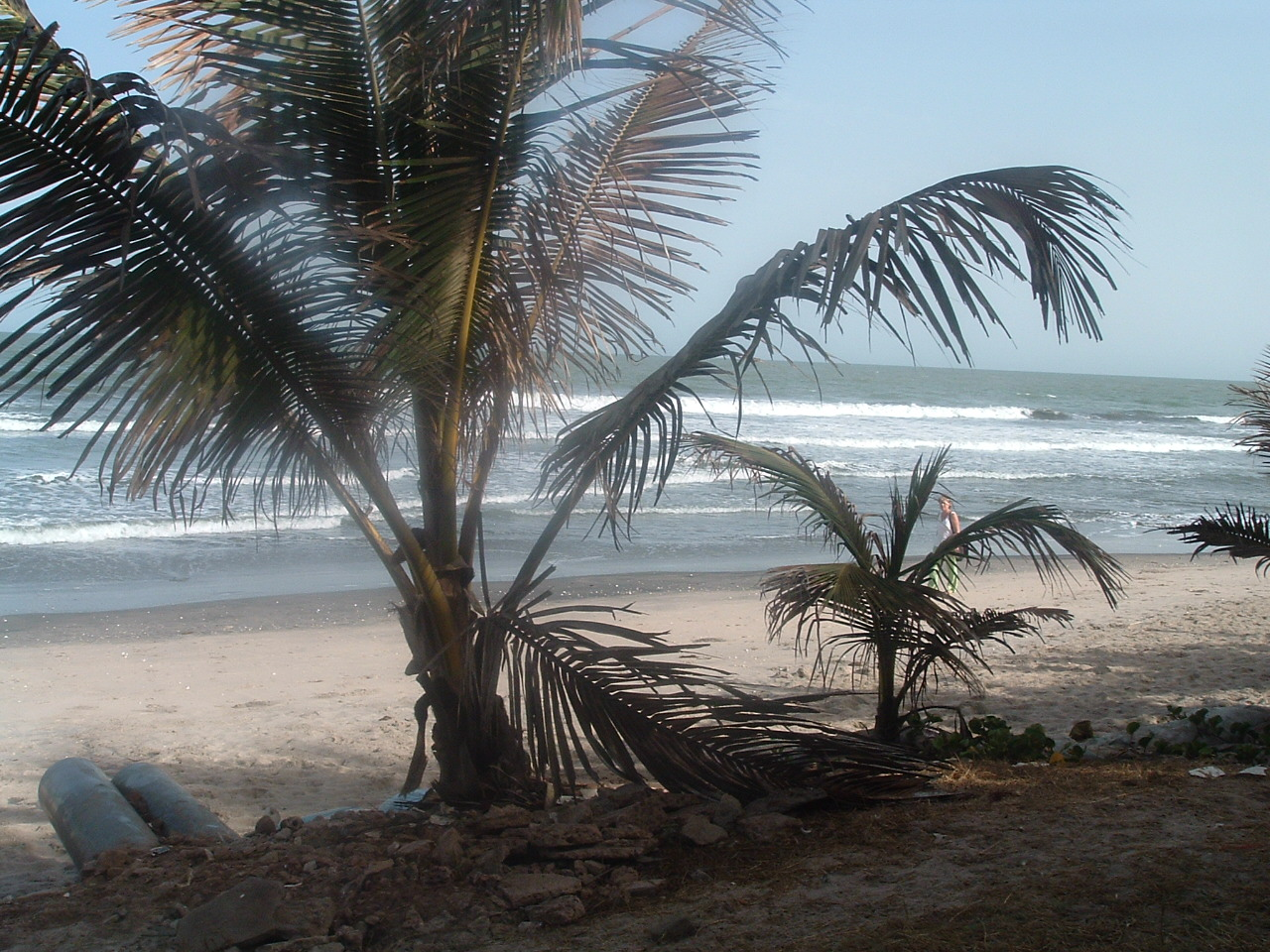
- Beach at Fajara

- Location in the Gambia
- Coordinates: 13°28′12″N 16°41′47″W
- Country: The Gambia
- Division: Banjul
- District: Kanifing

Fajara is a coastal suburb of Bakau in the Gambia.

It is home to Isatou Njie-Saidy, a former Vice-President of The Gambia; Patricia Aslup, a former US Ambassador; and was formerly the home town of the late Sir Dawda Kairaba Jawara, a former Prime Minister of The Gambia and the first President of The Gambia. The Medical Research Council is located within a fenced complex on Atlantic Boulevard. There is also a large military camp in the area.

== Tourism ==
Prior to the arrival of the first tourists in the 1960s the inhabitants' livelihoods revolved largely around fishing. Fajara is, however, becoming an increasingly popular tourist destination with around 20 hotel complexes on the beach and many more inland.

Bertil Harding Highway is one of the town's main thoroughfares, named after the pioneering Swedish tourist who arrived in 1965.

== Notable people ==
- Alieu Fadera
- Sir Dawda Jawara
- Julia Dolly Joiner
- Isatou Njie-Saidy
- Mohamadou Sumareh
- Malleh Sallah
- Dr Saja Taal

== Gallery ==
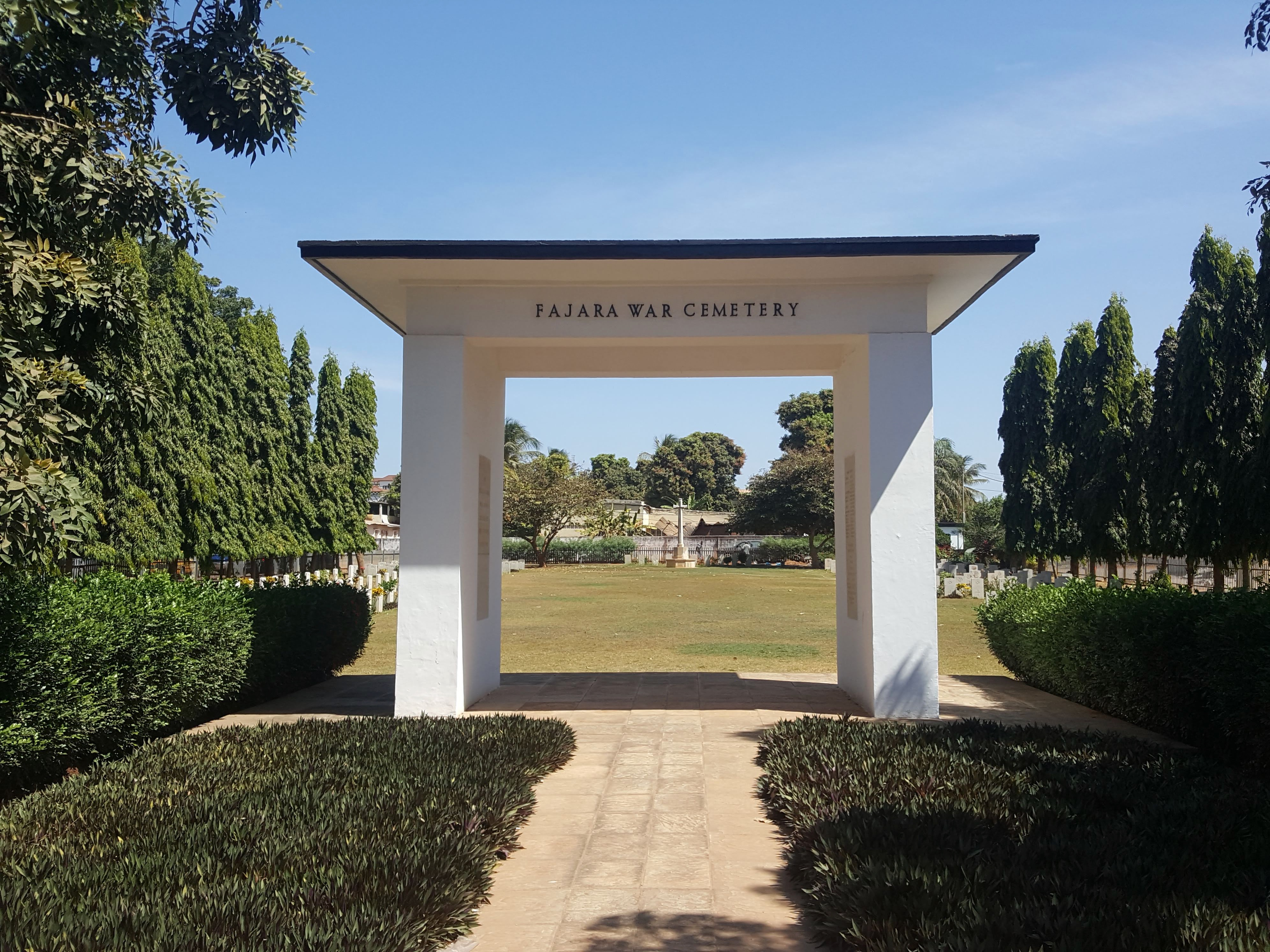
Fajara War Cemetery
