= Sir Dawda Kairaba Jawara International Conference Center =

Conference center in Gambia

Coordinates: 13.4373°N 16.724°W

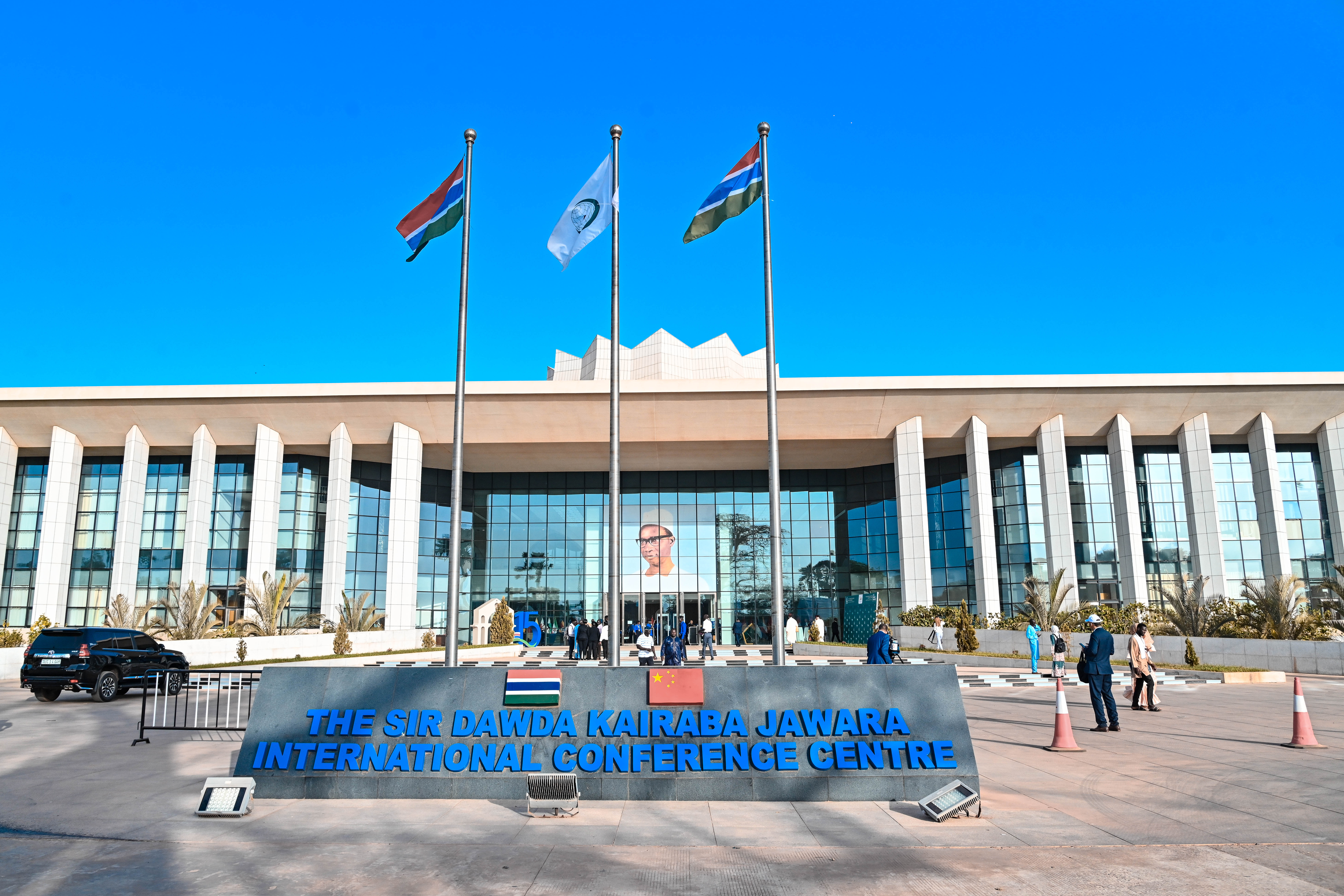
The Sir Dawda Kairaba Jawara International Conference Center

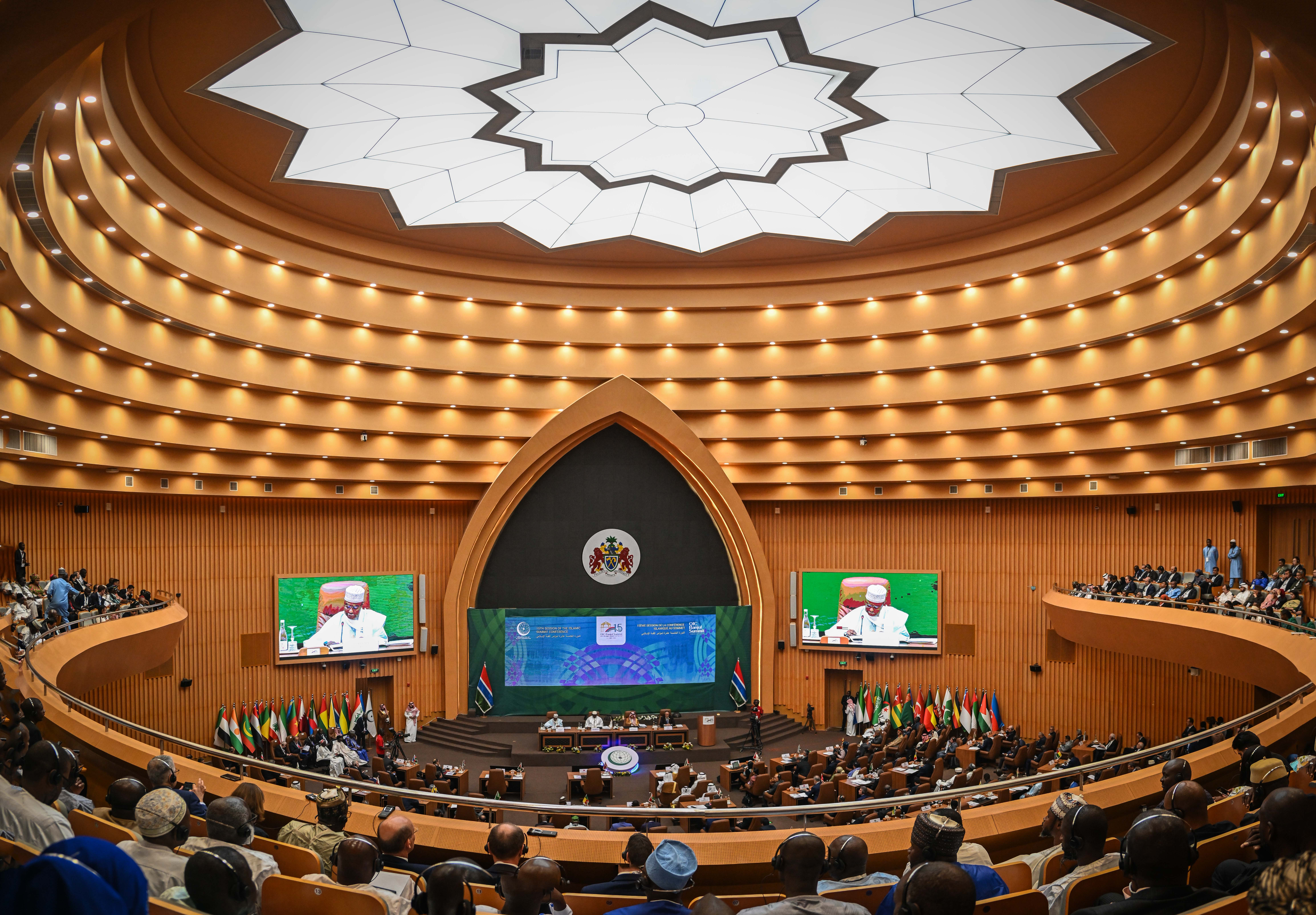
Interior

Sir Dawda Kairaba Jawara International Conference Center is a 14,000-square-metre (150,000 sq ft) conference center in The Gambia, located in Kombo North/Saint Mary. The project began in 2017 and inaugurated in January 2020. The construction of the part was controversial because it the construction removed important land from the Bijilo Forest Park, a popular tourist location and natural space home to endangered Western red colobus monkeys.

The conference center was built and funded by Chinese investment of US$50 million in the country. The center was treated as an important international gesture between the two countries, the first collaborative project since resumption of relations. The center was built in part to host the Organisation of Islamic Cooperation. The first major event in the space was the Annual General Meeting of the African Development Bank in August 2020.

The center was named after Dawda Kairaba Jawara, the first president of The Gambia.
