= Kololi =

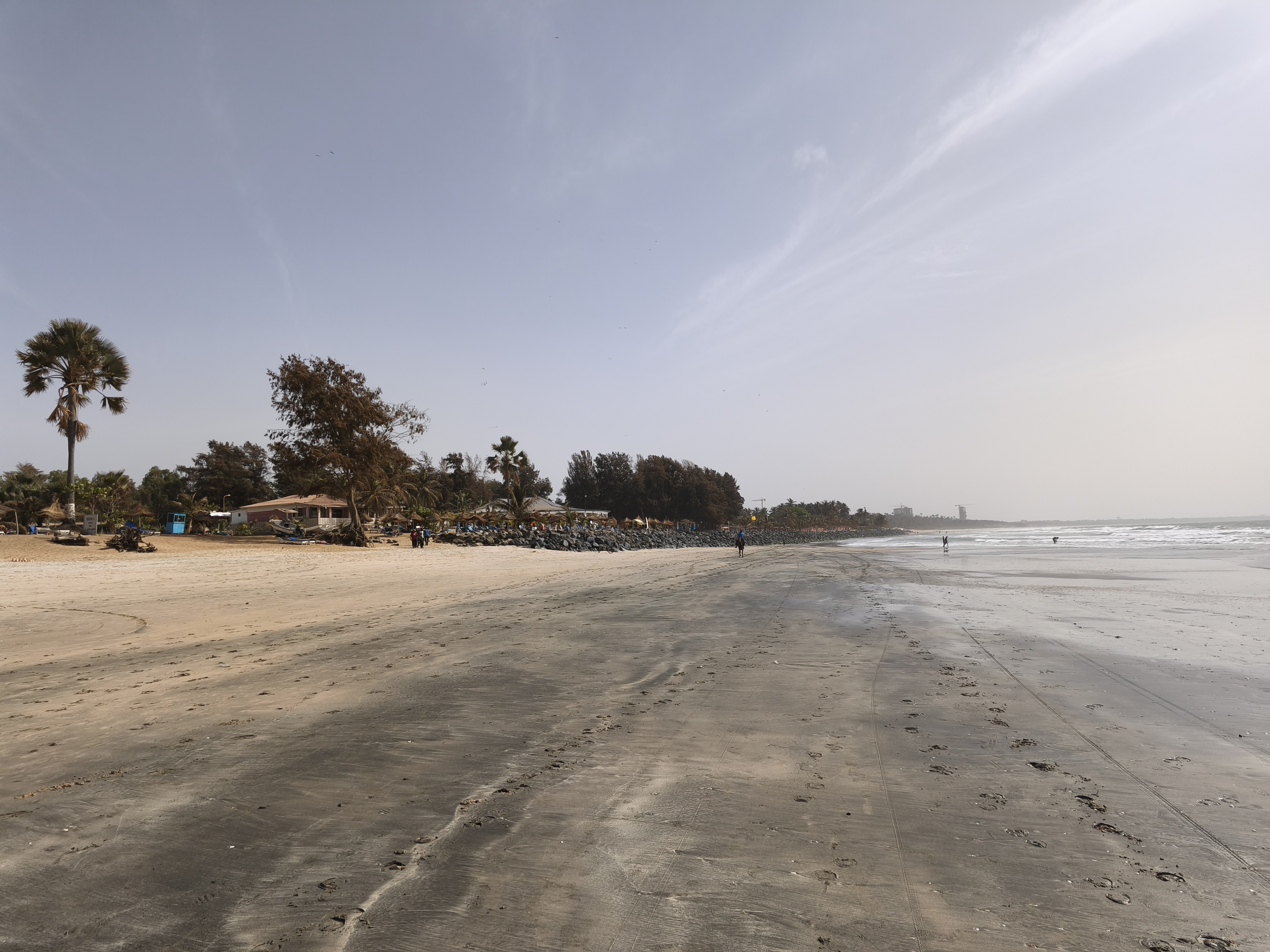

- Location in the Gambia
- Coordinates: 13°27′N 16°43′W
- Country: The Gambia
- Region: West Coast Division

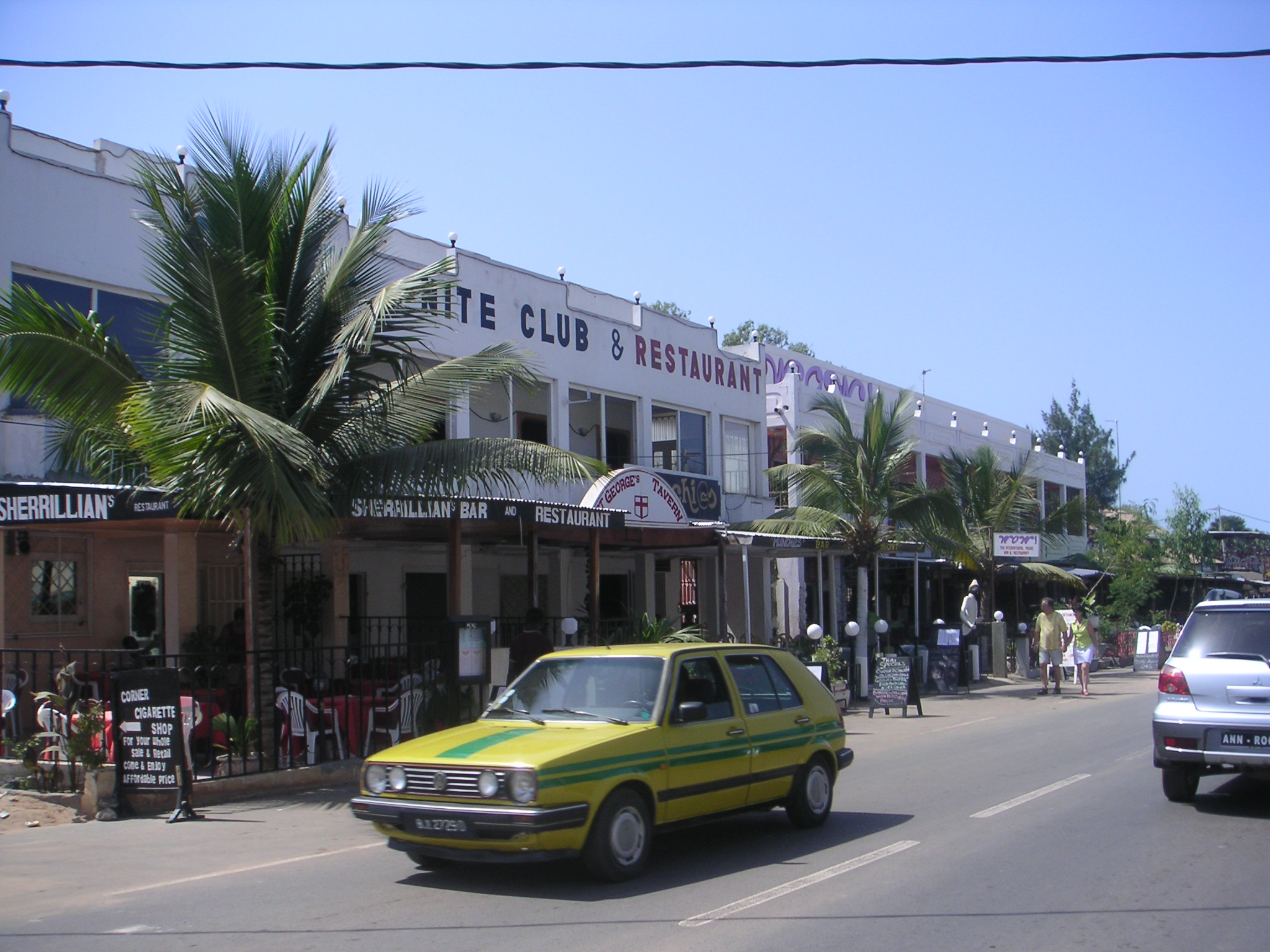
The tourist strip Senegambia

Kololi is a resort town on the shore of the Atlantic Ocean that is located near Serrekunda, The Gambia. It is surrounded by the Bijilo Forest.

The primary hotels are located on "The Strip" which is a short road leading to the beach and the hotels of Senegambia and the Kairaba. The Strip is lined with restaurants and entrance is monitored by the Gambian tourist police. A favorite with tourists, particularly from the UK, Belgium, Germany, and The Netherlands.

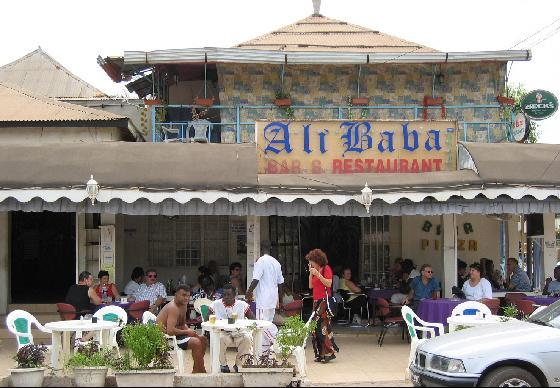
The Ali-Baba restaurant
