= Sayerr Jobe =

Founder of Serekunda

Sayerr Jobe was the founder of Serekunda, the largest city in The Gambia.

Sayerr was originally from the town in Koki in the Kingdom of Cayor, in what is now northern Senegal. He was part of the wider Jobe (or Diop) family, which also included Lat Dior Jobe (King of Cayor and Baol) and Massamba Koki Jobe, the serigne of Koki. He migrated to the region in the mid 19th century and is believed to have initially settled around Jinack Island, before relocating to the southern bank of the Gambia River where he established 'Sayerr Kunda', which over time transformed into 'Sere Kunda'. He died in 1896 and is buried at the Serrekunda Cemetery.

Today, one of the major thoroughfares of Serrekunda is named after him. Its renaming under president Yahya Jammeh, later reversed by his successor Adama Barrow, was controversial.
