= The Point (the Gambia) =

Gambian daily newspaper

- Type: Daily newspaper
- Format: Broadsheet
- Owner: Pap Saine
- Founder(s): Deyda Hydara, Pap Saine, Babucarr Gaye
- Editor-in-chief: Deyda Hydara (1991–2004), Pap Saine (1991–present)
- Founded: 1991
- Political alignment: Neutral
- Language: English
- Headquarters: Bakau, the Gambia
- Website: www.thepoint.gm

The Point is a daily newspaper published in Bakau, the Gambia.

== History ==
On 16 December 1991, The Point was founded by Pap Saine, Deyda Hydara, and Babucarr Gaye; Hydara and Saine had been friends since childhood. Gaye resigned four months later, and Hydara and Saine ran the paper together for the next decade. Saine also worked as a Reuters correspondent for West Africa.

During the first two years of its establishment, the paper came out every Monday, and then every Monday and Thursday. In 1995, the paper came out thrice weekly, and then four times a week in 2001 (on Mondays, Wednesdays, Fridays and Saturdays). In 2006, the paper became a daily newspaper.

In the early 2000s, the paper ran a weekly history column. The Gambian statesman and historian Alieu Ebrima Cham Joof was a columnist and contributor to that column, some of which included The Genesis of The Half-Die Mosque by Alieu Ebrima Joof (Friday, 9 May 2003).

On 16 December 2004, Deyda Hydar, one of the paper's co-founders was assassinated under the administration of the Gambian dictator Yahya Jammeh. Following Hydrar's assassination, the paper continued to place the picture of Hydrar on its website with the text "Who killed Deyda Hydar?" After Hydrar death, his wife Mrs Maria Hydara replaced him on the management team.

== Hydara murder ==
On 14 December 2004, the Gambia passed two new media laws. One, the Criminal Code (Amendment) Bill 2004, allowed prison terms for defamation and sedition; the other, the Newspaper (Amendment) Bill 2004, required newspaper owners to purchase expensive operating licenses, registering their homes as security. Hydara announced his intent to challenge these laws, but on 16 December, was assassinated by an unknown gunman while driving home from work in Banjul. Hydara's murder was never solved.

Following Hydara's death, Saine continued to edit The Point, making it a daily in 2006. It soon became the Gambia's only independent newspaper.

== 2009 arrests ==
On 2 February 2009, Saine and Point reporter Modou Sanyang were arrested by Gambian police for suspicion of "publishing and spreading false information". Sanyang was released with a warning, but Saine was formally charged. According to the Media Foundation of West Africa, the arrests had been prompted by a Point story titled "Arrested Gambian Diplomat Sent to Mile 2", in which the paper reported that Lamini Sabi Sanyang, an arrested official from Gambia's US Embassy, had been transferred to Mile 2 Prison; Saine had been detained for refusing to reveal his source. One week later, following another report on Gambia's US Embassy, Saine was arrested again, interrogated at length, and given a second charge of "publishing and spreading false information".

On 24 February, authorities also accused Saine of being Senegalese and having obtained a Gambian birth certificate through "false statements". He faced separate trials for each set of charges, both on 12 March in Banjul. Reporters Without Borders described the investigation of Saine as "hounding" and called on Kamalesh Sharma, the Secretary General of the Commonwealth, to intervene.

On 9 April, the charges of "publishing and spreading false information" were formally dropped.

== Hydara murder controversy and defamation trial ==
In November 2008, the International Press Institute began a "Justice Denied" campaign pressing for investigations into violence against journalists in the Gambia, particularly the still-unsolved murder of Deyda Haydara. At a June 2009 press conference, Gambian President Yahya Jammeh disparaged questions about the Hydara investigation, saying "And up to now one of these stupid Web sites carries 'Who Killed Deyda Hydara'? Let them go and ask Deyda Hydara who killed him." The Gambia Press Union then published a statement criticizing the lack of press freedom in Gambia, the stalled progress of the investigation, and the president's remarks, which the union called "inappropriate". The statement ran in The Point and a weekly newspaper, Foroyaa, on 11 June.

The Gambian government responded by arresting six journalists: Pap Saine, News Editor Ebrima Sawaneh, and reporters Sarata Jabbi-Dibba and Pa Modou Faal of The Point; and editor Sam Saar and reporters Emil Touray of Foroyaa. The six were charged with sedition and criminal defamation of the president. Jabbi-Dibba (the only woman) was held in Mile 2 prison, while Saine, Sawaneh, Faal, Saar, and Touray were held in Old Jeshwang prison. On 8 August, Jabbi-Dibba's seven-month-old baby was taken away.

Numerous human rights NGOs protested the arrests and called the charges against the journalists to be dropped. Amnesty International designated the six as prisoners of conscience and demanded their immediate release. The Committee to Protect Journalists also campaigned for Saine's release, as did the World Organization Against Torture, the International Federation for Human Rights, International PEN, the PEN American Center, and Front Line Defenders. Jammeh continued to denounce the journalists, however, making a state television appearance to say "So they think they can hide behind so-called press freedom and violate the law and get away with it? They got it wrong this time ... We are going to prosecute them to the letter."

On 7 August 2009, the six were convicted and sentenced to two years' imprisonment in Mile 2 Prison, as well as a fine of 250,000 dalasi (£5,780) apiece. However, Jammeh pardoned them in September, following a campaign of "domestic and international pressure". The pardons were issued to coincide with Ramadan.

== Awards and recognition ==
Hydara was posthumously awarded the PEN/Barbara Goldsmith Freedom to Write Award in 2005, and the Hero of African Journalism Award of The African Editors' Forum in 2010, sharing the latter with disappeared journalist Ebrima Manneh.

In 2006, Saine was awarded the Johann Philipp Palm Award for his work with the paper. The award is named for a bookseller executed by Napoleon, and recognizes individuals who are "of outstanding prominence in the promotion of freedom of opinion and the press".

In 2010, Saine was named a World Press Freedom Hero by the International Press Institute. He is the third West African to have won the title, following Kenneth Best (Liberia) and Freedom Neruda (Côte d'Ivoire). Saine described the award as a morale-booster and "an inspiration for journalists who are fighting for freedom of the press and the interests of justice, democracy and human rights not only in the Gambia but in all of Africa".
