= Bai Modi Joof =

Gambian barrister

Alhaji Bai Modi Joof
- Born: Bai Modi Joof; 15 December 1933 (age 92); Kuntaur, the Gambia
- Died: June 3, 1993 (aged 59); Latrikunda, the Gambia
- Resting place: Latrikunda Cemetery, Gambia
- Education: University (Law)
- Occupation: Barrister at Law
- Known for: Law, free speech and freedom of the press
- Title: LLB
- Children: Tamsier Joof (third child)
- Parent(s): Ebrima Joof and Aji Anna Samba
- Relatives: Alhaji Alieu Ebrima Cham Joof (older brother), Pap Cheyassin Secka (nephew)

Alhaji Bai Modi Joof (or Bai Modi Joof, 15 December 1933 – 3 June 1993) was a barrister at law from the Gambia, practicing from the mid-1970s to 1993, the year he died. Also known as Alhaji B.M. Joof, B.M. Joof or Lawyer Joof, he was a member of the UK and Gambian Bar, and a barrister and solicitor of the Gambian Supreme Court. He was termed the "champion of free speech" by some quarters of the Gambian press during the administration of president Sir Dawda Kairaba Jawara. He was a defense-barrister and came from a Wolof and Serer background of the family Joof. He is not to be confused with his former protégé, Joseph Henry Joof, who is also commonly referred to as Lawyer Joof (the former attorney general).

== Early life ==
Bai Modi was born on 15 December 1933 at Kuntaur (a Gambian town) to Ebrima Joof and Aji Anna Samba. He was named after his paternal grandfather Modi Joof (a Serer prince of Sine-Saloum and Jolof origins), and was the younger brother of Alhaji Alieu Ebrima Cham Joof, the Gambian historian, politician and nationalist during the country's colonial period. Bai Modi attended the Roman School in Banjul before passing his primary exams and progressed to the Gambia High School in Banjul (now the Gambia Senior Secondary School). In the Gambia, Bai Modi held various jobs, but mainly as a civil servant working as a tax-assessor. He left for the United Kingdom in the late 1950s to study law where he was also employed as a civil servant working as a tax officer with the Inland Revenue (now the HMRC). Having studied law at the University of London (Senate House) he was called to the bar on 26 November 1974 and was a member of the Honourable Society of Lincoln's Inn. The following year (1975), Bai Modi left the UK with his family and returned to the Gambia where he established his chambers called Gal N'Goneh Fambai's Chambers in the Gambian capital of Banjul at number 5 Wellington Street. His chambers which was next to the river had to be relocated to number 2 Hagan Street (Banjul) around 1990 - 1991, adjacent to the Point Newspaper at number 1A, which became its official base until Bai Modi's death.

== Legal career ==
As an expert on International and English Law, Bai Modi travelled extensively to Europe especially the E.U. during his legal career in order to represent his clients. In the Gambia, he was one of the prominent barristers of his generation. He achieved particular fame and notoriety when he represented the editor of the Nation Newspaper in 1984 charged with sedition, during the administration of president Sir Dawada Kairaba Jawara. The doyen of the Gambian press, William Dixon Colley who was a close friend and owner of the Nation newspaper as well as the co-founder and acting Director General of the Gambia Press Union (GPU), requested the legal services of Bai Modi Joof. Bai Modi represented the editor and won the case and all the charges were dismissed. From that year on, the veteran Gambian journalist and newspaper owner (William Dixon) among with his colleagues at the GPU impressed by Bai Modi performances in the Gambian court and abroad, decided to appoint him as the GPU's legal advisor, a position he occupied for several years. During his legal career, Bai Modi is reported to have played a crucial role through his performance of duty, in breaching the gap between the Gambian political elite and the GPU. His court performances brought about a "cordial relationship between the Gambia Press Union and the government" as well as "between him and his colleagues".

== Death and legacy ==
Alhaji Bai Modi Joof died on 3 June 1993 at his family home in Latrikunda, a suburb of Serekunda. During his legal career, Bai Modi possessed a reputation among the Gambian press as the champion and defender of free speech and the freedom of the press. According to Gambian tradition, he represented all social classes, from the upper echelons of Gambian society to the poorest. Following his death, his elder brother (A.E. Cham Joof) dedicated his book "Gambia, Land of our heritage" to him. The death of Bai Modi in 1993 also coincided with William Dixon Colley's own retirement from professional journalism. In paying tribute to the passing of Bai Modi, William Dixon Colley said:

The willingness to help in times of stress, in spite of the heavy burdens thrust upon him, and his respect for all, irrespective of class or ethnic background - this was his contribution to the aim of democracy in our society. In this short tribute from the Press, Bai Modi deserves a place among the gallant bearers of man's humanity to man.

— William Dixon Colley
