= Ndey Tapha Sosseh =

Gambian journalist (born 1979)

Ndey Tapha Sosseh (born 1979) is a Gambian journalist and unionist. In 2004, she became editor-in-chief of The Daily Observer, making her the first female editor-in-chief of a daily newspaper in the Gambia's history. From 2008 to 2011, she served as president of the Gambia Press Union.

Sosseh was a government target during the final years of Yahya Jammeh's presidency, largely because of her response to the killing of the journalist Deyda Hydara, and she spent 2009–2017 in Mali, where she holds dual citizenship.

== Early life ==
Ndey Tapha Sosseh was born in 1979 in Banjul, the Gambian capital. Her parents were Adelaide Sosseh Gaye, a human rights activist, and Mustapha Sosseh, who died unexpectedly when her mother was three months pregnant with her.

== Career ==
Sosseh began her career as an intern at The Daily Observer, the Gambia's first daily newspaper, in June 1998. She then became a reporter and editor for the newspaper, eventually running its "Women in Development" column.

In 2000, she moved to the United Kingdom for further training in journalism. She obtained a master's degree in international journalism from the University of Central England in Birmingham and also studied at Warwickshire College before returning to the Gambia in June 2004.

After returning home, she became editor-in-chief of The Daily Observer later that year, making her the first woman to lead a daily newspaper in the Gambia.

In January 2005, she was succeeded in the role by Momodou Sanyang.

Two months later, she was elected general secretary of the Gambia Press Union. Then, in 2008, she was elected president of the GPU, succeeding outgoing president Madi Ceesay.

She held the presidency until 2011, when Emil Touray ran against her and won, becoming the new GPU leader.

During her time as president of the GPU, Sosseh went into exile in Bamako, Mali, beginning in June 2009. She had become a government target due to her outspokenness in the years following the killing of fellow journalist Deyda Hydara.

In 2011, she was charged with treason in the Gambia over her work with a group called Coalition for Change – The Gambia (CCG), and the Gambian government under Foreign Minister Mamadou Tangara sought her extradition. In response, the International Federation of Journalists hired round-the-clock security to protect her. Tangara later denied that he sought to have her extradited and said he had instead advocated for her protection.

Sosseh returned to the Gambia from exile in October 2017, after Yahya Jammeh was voted out in the 2016 Gambian presidential election. She subsequently worked as an advisor to Minister for Communication and Information Demba A. Jawo.

In July 2019, Sosseh testified in front of the Gambia's Truth, Reconciliation and Reparations Commission, sharing her experiences with self-censorship and pressure on journalists under President Yahya Jammeh.

== Personal life ==
Sosseh's husband is Malian, which allowed her to gain Malian dual citizenship.
