= Pap Saine =

Gambian editor and publisher

- Occupations: Newspaper editor and publisher
- Organization: The Point (1991-present)
- Known for: independent journalism
- Awards: IPI World Press Freedom Hero (2010)

Pap Saine is a Gambian editor and publisher of the English-language independent newspaper, The Point. In 2010, the International Press Institute named him a World Press Freedom Hero for his work.

== Work with The Point ==
On 16 December 1991, Pap Saine co-founded The Point along with Deyda Hydara and Babucarr Gaye; Hydara and Saine had been friends since childhood. Gaye resigned four months later, and Hydara and Saine ran the paper together for the next decade. Saine also worked as a Reuters correspondent for West Africa.

On 14 December 2004, the Gambia passed two new media laws. One, the Criminal Code (Amendment) Bill 2004, allowed prison terms for defamation and sedition; the other, the Newspaper (Amendment) Bill 2004, required newspaper owners to purchase expensive operating licenses, registering their homes as security. Hydara announced his intent to challenge these laws, but on 16 December, was assassinated by an unknown gunman while driving home from work in Banjul. Hydara's murder was never solved. The following year, he was posthumously awarded the PEN/Barbara Goldsmith Freedom to Write Award.

Following Hydara's death, Saine continued to edit The Point, making it a daily in 2006. The Point soon became the only independent newspaper in the Gambia.

== 2009 arrests ==
On 2 February 2009, Saine and Point reporter Modou Sanyang were arrested by Gambian police for suspicion of "publishing and spreading false information". Sanyang was released with a warning, but Saine was formally charged. According to the Media Foundation of West Africa, the arrests had been prompted by a Point story titled "Arrested Gambian Diplomat Sent to Mile 2", in which the paper reported that Lamini Sabi Sanyang, an arrested official from Gambia's US Embassy, had been transferred to Mile 2 Prison; Saine had been detained for refusing to reveal his source. One week later, following another report on Gambia's US Embassy, Saine was arrested again, interrogated at length, and given a second charge of "publishing and spreading false information".

On 24 February, authorities also accused Saine of being Senegalese and having obtained a Gambian birth certificate through "false statements". He faced separate trials for each set of charges, both on 12 March in Banjul. Reporters Without Borders described the investigation of Saine as "hounding" and called on Kamalesh Sharma, the Secretary General of the Commonwealth, to intervene.

On 9 April, the charges of "publishing and spreading false information" were formally dropped.

== Hydara murder controversy and defamation trial ==
In November 2008, the International Press Institute began a "Justice Denied" campaign pressing for investigations into violence against journalists in the Gambia, particularly the still-unsolved murder of Deyda Haydara. At a June 2009 press conference, Gambian President Yahya Jammeh disparaged questions about the Hydara investigation, saying "And up to now one of these stupid Web sites carries 'Who Killed Deyda Hydara'? Let them go and ask Deyda Hydara who killed him." The Gambia Press Union then published a statement criticizing the lack of press freedom in Gambia, the stalled progress of the investigation, and the president's remarks, which the union called "inappropriate". The statement ran in The Point and a weekly newspaper, Foroyaa, on 11 June.

The Gambian government responded by arresting six journalists: Pap Saine, News Editor Ebrima Sawaneh, and reporters Sarata Jabbi-Dibba and Pa Modou Faal of The Point; and editor Sam Saar and reporters Emil Touray of Foroyaa. The six were charged with sedition and criminal defamation of the president. Jabbi-Dibba (the only woman) was held in Mile 2 prison, while Saine, Sawaneh, Faal, Saar, and Touray were held in Old Jeshwang prison. On 8 August, Jabbi-Dibba's seven-month-old baby was taken away.

Numerous human rights NGOs protested the arrests and called the charges against the journalists to be dropped. Amnesty International designated the six as prisoners of conscience and demanded their immediate release. The Committee to Protect Journalists also campaigned for Saine's release, as did the World Organization Against Torture, the International Federation for Human Rights, International PEN, the PEN American Center, and Front Line Defenders. Jammeh continued to denounce the journalists, however, making a state television appearance to say "So they think they can hide behind so-called press freedom and violate the law and get away with it? They got it wrong this time ... We are going to prosecute them to the letter."

On 7 August 2009, the six were convicted and sentenced to two years' imprisonment in Mile 2 Prison, as well as a fine of 250,000 dalasi (£5,780) apiece. However, Jammeh pardoned them in September, following a campaign of "domestic and international pressure". The pardons were issued to coincide with Ramadan.

== Awards and recognition ==
Saine was awarded the Johann Philipp Palm Award in 2006. The award is named for a bookseller executed by Napoleon, and recognizes individuals who are "of outstanding prominence in the promotion of freedom of opinion and the press".

In 2010, Saine was named a World Press Freedom Hero by the International Press Institute. He is the third West African to have won the title, following Kenneth Best (Liberia) and Freedom Neruda (Côte d'Ivoire). Saine described the award as a morale-booster and "an inspiration for journalists who are fighting for freedom of the press and the interests of justice, democracy and human rights not only in the Gambia but in all of Africa".
