= Burgess Carr =

Liberian priest and professor

The Reverend Canon Burgess Carr
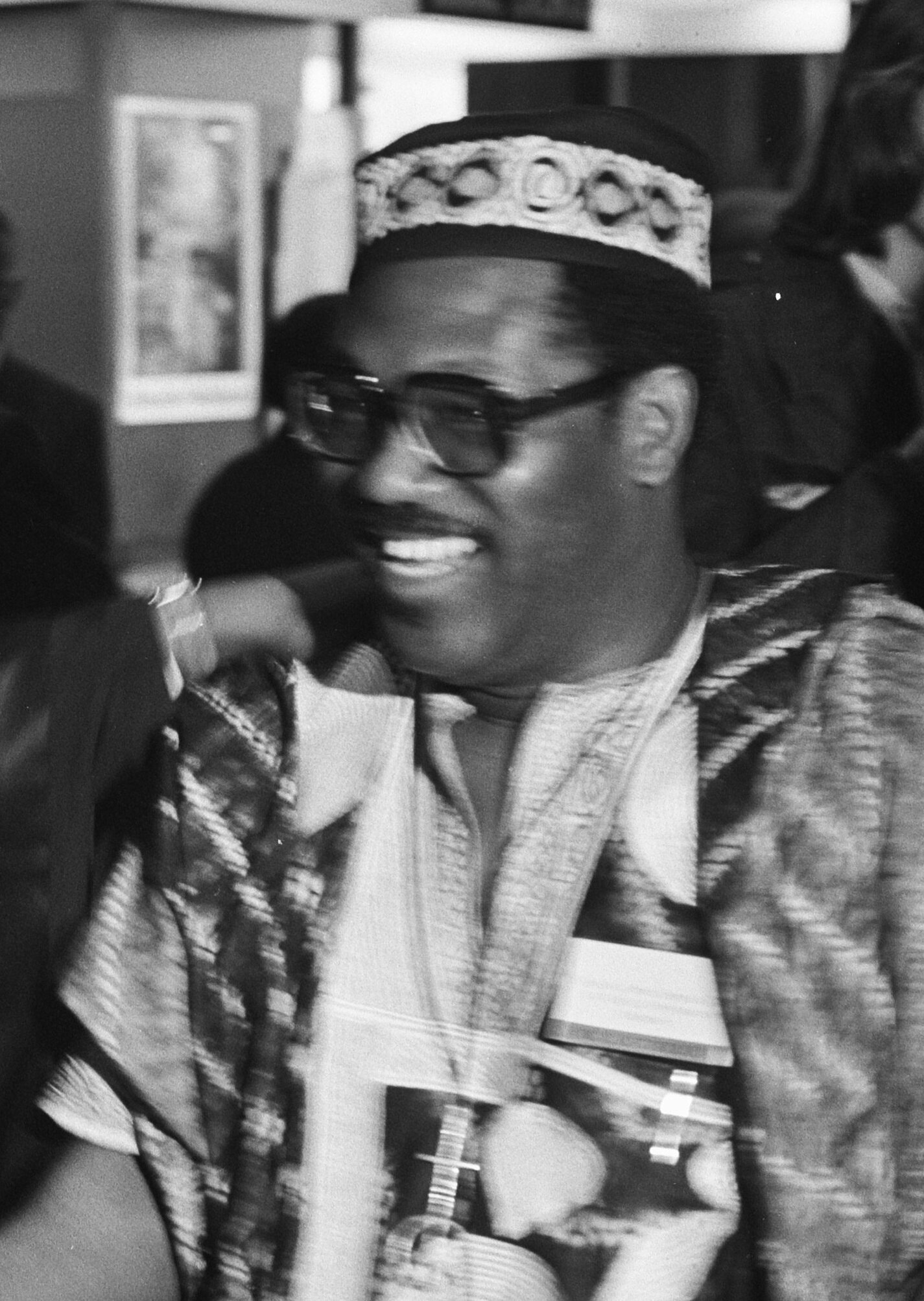
- Burgess Carr (WCC, 1972)
- Born: 8 July 1935; Crozerville, Liberia
- Died: 14 May 2012 (aged 76); Lawrenceville, Georgia, U.S.
- Occupation: Priest

The Reverend Canon Burgess Carr (8 July 1935 – 14 May 2012) was a Liberian-born priest, religious leader, and professor. He was Secretary-General of the All Africa Conference of Churches (AACC) from 1971 to 1978 and, in 1972, moderated the Addis Ababa Agreement, which ended the First Sudanese Civil War (1955–1972).

He was awarded the distinction of Grand Corodon in the Order of the Two Niles by Sudanese President Gaafar Nimeiry for his role in mediating the Addis Ababa Agreement and Commander in the Order of the Star of Africa by the Liberian President William Tubman for his involvement in relief and reconciliation efforts during the Nigerian Civil War (1960–1970).

== Early life and education ==
Burgess Carr was born in Crozerville, Montserrado County, Liberia. He attended St. Patrick's Elementary School in Monrovia Liberia, and Episcopal High School in Grand Cape Mount County, Liberia. He graduated in 1958 from Cuttington College with a Bachelor of Science in agriculture, where his thesis was"The Comparative Growth and Performance of two Groups of Rhode Island Reds: One Group fed with a diet made from locally available feedstuffs, and the other Group fed with imported commercial feed."

Continuing on at Cuttington, he earned a Bachelor of Divinity degree in 1961 and was ordained as a Deacon in the Episcopal Diocese of Liberia the same year. In 1962, he was ordained as a Priest in the Episcopal Diocese of Liberia, and joined the staff of Trinity Cathedral in Monrovia, Liberia, under the Deanship of the Very Rev. Dr. Seth C. Edwards, who had been the First President of Cuttington College. (Note: In 1982 the Episcopal Diocese of Liberia joined the Church of the Province of West Africa. For the leadership of Trinity Cathedral of Monrovia, see "Profile of Trinity Cathedral". www.trinitycathedralliberia.org. Trinity Cathedral. 2016. For biographic notes on Seth Edwards, see his obituary in the New York Times "Seth Edwards, Missionary in Liberia 3 Decades, 72". New York Times. New York. 24 January 1977.) During the same year, he married Francesca Verdier, whom he had met at Cuttington.

In 1964, Burgess Carr travelled to the United States, where he began graduate studies in the Old Testament at Harvard University's Divinity School under the direction of G. Ernest Wright and Frank Moore Cross, Jr. He earned a Master of Theology there in 1966. He left further studies toward a Doctor of Theology at Harvard Divinity School to accept a position in Geneva, Switzerland at the World Council of Churches, where he was deeply involved in relief and reconciliation work during the Nigerian Civil War (1960–1970). It was for this work that he was awarded the distinction of Commander in the Order of the Star of Africa by the Liberian President William Tubman.

== Career ==
Burgess Carr served with the World Council of Churches for four years from 1967 to 1971, first as Secretary for Africa (1967–1970) and then as Secretary for the Commission of Churches on International Affairs. He left the World Council of Churches in 1971 to accept the position of Secretary General of the All Africa Conference of Churches headquartered in Nairobi, Kenya.

=== Addis Ababa Agreement (1972) ===
During his time as Secretary General of the All Africa Conference of Churches, Carr moderated the discussions leading to the signing of the Addis Ababa Agreement (1972), which ended the First Sudanese Civil War (1955–1972) in Sudan. He is widely credited with keeping the negotiations on track, and the trust and respect that he engendered was crucial to the success of the talks that produced the Agreement. He was awarded the Knight Great Band in the Humane Order of African Redemption by the Liberian President William V.S. Tubman Jr. and the Grand Cordon in the Order of the Two Niles by Sudanese President Gaafar Nimeiry for his role in mediating the Addis Ababa Agreement.

=== Teaching, pastoral work, and later career (1978–2000) ===
In 1978, after conflicts with member churches and Kenyan officials, Burgess Carr resigned from the All Africa Conference of Churches and returned to the United States. He settled in Boston, Massachusetts, where he began teaching at Harvard Divinity School. Carr subsequently taught at the Andover Newton Theological School, Boston University School of Theology, and the Episcopal Divinity School, while also a pastor at St. Mark's Episcopal Church in Boston. In 1982, Burgess left Boston for New Haven, Connecticut, taking the position of associate professor of Pastoral Theology at Yale University's Berkeley Divinity School. In New Haven, he also served as Vicar of St. Andrew's Episcopal Church. He later spent several years working for the Episcopal Migration Ministries, International Council for Voluntary Agencies, the United Nations Development Programme, the World Bank, UNICEF, the Economic Commission for Africa and other international organizations. In 2000, Carr moved to Georgia, where he taught at the Interdenominational Theological Center and the Candler School of Theology at Emory University while serving as Vicar of St. Timothy's Episcopal Church in Decatur, Georgia.

=== Moratorium on missionaries ===
Carr was a critical student of colonialism and the neo-colonialism and paternalism of missionary work in Africa. He supported a "moratorium on missionaries" (a moratorium on African churches receiving funds and personnel from churches in Europe and North America). (Note: For background and the debates surrounding moratorium proposals in the 1970s, see Reese, Robert (2014). "John Gatu and the moratorium on missionaries". Missiology: An International Review. 42 (3): 245–256. doi:10.1177/0091829613502143. S2CID 153435116.)

[A]s long as the churches in Africa remain "potted plants," nurtured by ideas, funds and personnel from churches in Europe and North America, their real relevance to the urgent questions facing Africa and its people will continue to be distorted. — Canon Burgess Carr, African Churches in Conflict, The Harvard Crimson

== Death ==
In 2004, Burgess was diagnosed with Lewy bodies disease. He suffered a stroke in 2007. He died on 14 May 2012.

The Carr, Eastman, Thorpe, Weeks and Padmore families regret to announce that the Reverend Dr. Canon Burgess Carr, age 76 of Lawrenceville, passed away Monday, May 14, 2012. Canon Carr, a native of Liberia, served as an ordained minister for 51 years and was most recently Vicar of St. Timothy's Episcopal Church in Decatur from 2000-2005. Canon Carr began his ministry in Liberia and served in many international ecumenical positions, among them Secretary-General of the All Africa Conference of Churches, before moving to the Atlanta area in 2000. He is most well-known for his writings and speeches on African Theology and for moderating the 1972 peace agreement that resulted in a 17-year respite from war in Sudan. He leaves behind his wife of 50 years: Francesca Carr, Lawrenceville; Children: Audrey Carr & Dale Wesselman, NY; Kedrick Carr, NY; Oyeshiku Carr & Danielle Tully-Carr, Germany; Yao Carr, Loganville; Mleh Carr & Erin Littles, Decatur; Fatu Carr, NY; Brothers: Gyude Bryant, Kenneth Y. Best, Anthony Deline; Sisters: Carmenia Abdallah, Mara Amachree, Murial Best, Odelle Deline; 7 Grandchildren; and numerous nieces & nephews — Obituary for Rev. Canon Burgess Carr, Chapel of Tim Stewart Funeral Home

== Bibliography ==
- — (1987). "Apocalypse Now: The Churches and Revolution in South Africa". Southern Africa: Prospects for Peace and Security : the Second International Conference on Peace and Security in Southern Africa, Arusha International Conference Centre, United Republic of Tanzania, 2–6 March 1986. New York, NY: Brill. pp. 67–80. ISBN 978-0-89838-921-0.
- — (18 April 1978). "African Churches in Conflict". The Harvard Crimson.
- — (1975). "The Mission of the Moratorium" (PDF). Occasional Bulletin of the Missionary Research Library. 25 (2). Archived from the original on 1 December 2017.
- — (1975). "The Moratorium: The Search for Self-Reliance and Authenticity". All-Africa Conference of Churches Bulletin (AACC Bulletin). 7 (3): 36–44.
- — (1975). "Biblical and Theological Basis for the Struggle for Human Rights". The Ecumenical Review. 27 (2): 117–123. doi:10.1111/j.1758-6623.1975.tb01154.x.
