= Archaeology of Providence Island, Liberia =

Location of Providence Island in Liberia

1890 sketch of Providence Island, Liberia by Johann Büttikofer

Providence Island, Liberia, originally Dozoa, then Perseverance Island, is an archaeological site off the coast of Liberia marking Liberian indigenous and colonial history. Some consider the site the “Plymouth Rock” of Liberian heritage and the origin point for emancipated African Americans. But beyond its colonial history, indigenous Liberians have long used and inhabited the site.

== Background - “The Love of Liberty Brought Us Here.” ==
Providence Island, Liberia, is an island in the middle of the mouth of the Mesurado River. The river cuts through the middle of Liberia's capital city, Monrovia. The island marks the landscape and serves as a monument to Liberia’s establishment as the first African Republic.

=== Indigenous habitation ===
Indigenous Liberians have long used the island. According to Luminescence dating of pottery sherds, the island has been estimated to be inhabited, at the earliest, since the 14th century. Indigenous Liberians originally named the island Dozoa, meaning “land in the center of water” in Gola. Before colonization by emancipated African Americans, the island served as a ritualistic space and trading post for indigenous Liberian ethnic groups. In Ethnographic accounts of the Poro and Sande, an indigenous social and educational institution, the space was used for coming-of-age rituals. People transitioning into adulthood would seek advisement from a spiritual advisor and spend time in the “wilderness.” The space also became a trading post for Indigenous Liberians. Indigenous chiefs built a Palaver hut, a building for welcoming others and meditation, to engage in European trade. This is evident in historical records of Dutch, Portuguese, and English interacting with Indigenous Liberians. The Portuguese traded guns, gunpowder, bracelets, iron bars, and knives in exchange for palm oil, wax, and spices from the West African Coast. European and local ceramics further confirm this, predating the arrival of colonists. The arrival of European groups disrupted social and political institutions. With the introduction of trade, the bartering system was replaced with a for-profit economic system brought into the interior. As well as, the introduction of Transatlantic Slave Trade.

The island was also used for the slave trade. In 1807, there was documented slave trade. While the British military intervened in 1813 to enforce their ban on the slave trade, the slave trade was documented in action just 3 years later. The slave trade in Liberia remained active even as emancipated African Americans started colonizing the area.

=== Colonial inhabitants ===
Photograph of Providence Island from Monrovia, Liberia.

In 1822, 88 African Americans immigrated on the Nautilus to what is now Monrovia, Liberia, first settling on Providence Island. The American Colonization Society (ACS) brought Black Americans to Liberia. The ACS, established in 1816 by slave owners, was made up of both abolitionists and enslavers attempting to move freed African Americans back to Western Africa. The major fear backing this organization was of a race war that could break out. The ACS to Black Americans was an escape from the racial violence and oppression experienced in the United States as freed individuals. giving them access to land, resources, and autonomy that was unattainable in the contemporary United States. For some, it was even the only way to be emancipated, as many slave owners offered freedom in exchange for immigrating to Liberia when they died.

As Black Americans colonized Liberia, many migrants applied Euro-american predispositions to the West African coast. While some assimilated into the Indigenous Liberian communities, the majority of the African Americans reproduced the systems and culture of the United States, creating a new class of Liberian settlers. Colonists almost always held leadership positions of the early Liberian state. In many cases oppressing indigenous populations with violence to quell revolts and garnish taxes.

== Back-to-Africa Heritage Project and Archaeology ==
The Back-to-Africa Heritage and Archaeology project (BAHA) explores Liberia's heritage and history within the African Diaspora and the Back-to-Africa movement. Excavations began in 2017 in Crozierville, a settlement of Afro-Barbadian migrants, but excavations on Providence Island began in 2019 after a sacred cotton tree fell in a storm. Salvage excavations occurred, that were followed by excavations in 2022 and 2023. The project is run by American universities, City College of New York, the University of Arkansas, Northwestern University, and the University of Pennsylvania, in collaboration with the University of Liberia and Cuttington University. The BAHA project is one of the first major archaeological projects to take place in Liberia since the Civil Wars (1980-2003). More archaeological work has continued to emerge since.

=== Archaeology of Providence Island ===
The first excavation took place in 2019, after a sacred cotton tree fell, at the invitation of Liberia’s Minister of Information, Culture, and Tourism. The cotton tree predated the colonization of Liberia, additionally, the tree was the spot where the first negotiations between the indigenous Liberians and colonists took place. Excavations beyond the cotton tree took place in 2022 and 2023, with the most successful work in the center of the island. In all of the test units excavated, a mix of local indigenous wares and imported wares, from the United States and Europe, pre and post the arrival of African American settlers.

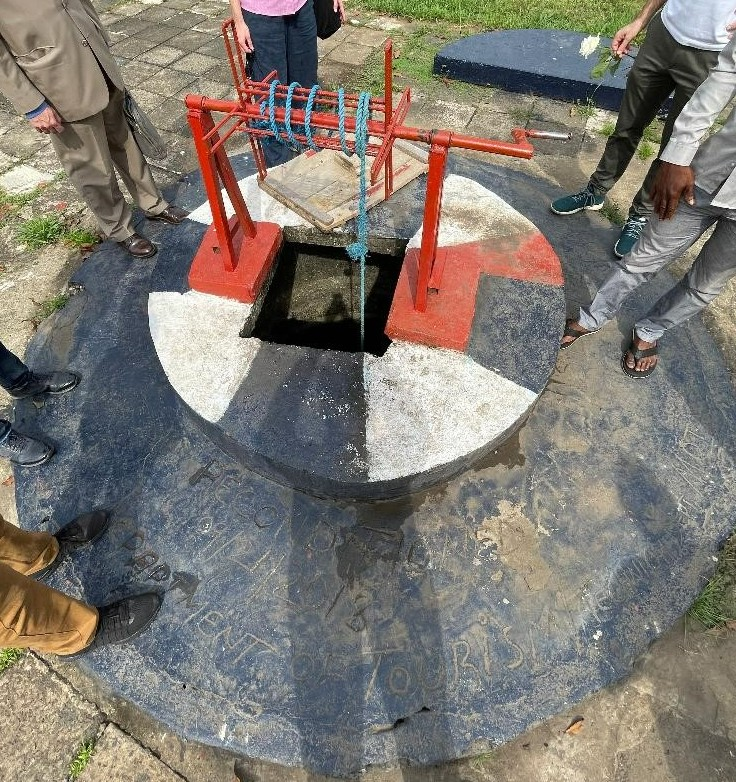
Original well dug by African American settlers on Providence Island, Liberia.

Most of the wares found on the Island were imported, of which, 40 percent of imported wares were whiteware vessels. Some were decorated, but most were undecorated, consisting of bowls, chamber pots, and plates. Other imported goods excavated pre-dating the 1822 settlers include Dutch schnapps bottles, English earthenware, and clay pipes. These goods point to an already present trade relationship between Indigenous Liberians and European countries. 95 sherds of German stoneware jugs from both before and after colonial occupations point to interconnected trade between early Liberia and European states. The German stoneware jugs from the latter half of the 19th century were mineral water jugs found near the well dug by colonists during the early habitation. This reflects the fact that many of the first settlers died from water-borne illnesses.

Local material culture was also present at the site. Under the roots of the fallen cotton tree were indigenous-made ceramics locally called “Country pots.” With limited typologies of local Liberian ceramics, not many conclusions can be drawn about the use, production, and origins of the ceramics. Archaeologists conclude that smaller locally made vessels are associated with rituals and traditional medicines for the Poro and Sande. Using thermoluminescence analysis on the ceramics and associated soil, archaeologists date the ceramics to the 15th-16th centuries, with a single sherd dating to the 8th-10th centuries.

The archaeological assemblages represent both indigenous Liberians' and settlers' use of the island. Archaeologists noted no clear separation of material culture between the two groups’ occupations. Indigenous Liberians used Providence Island for their own cultural practices and trade before settlers occupied it. As African Americans settled the island, imported goods still appear in the archaeological record.

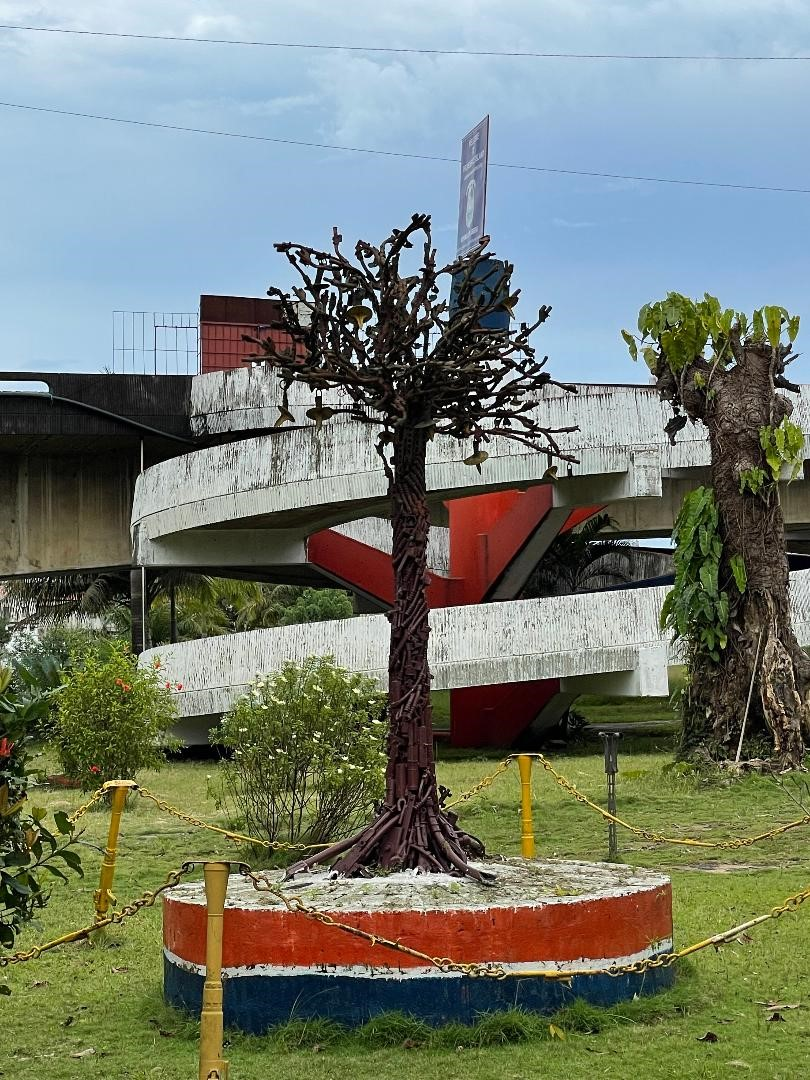
A photograph of a metal tree made of firearms on Providence Island, Liberia. Representing the peace made after the Liberian Civil War (1989-2003).

Evidence of Liberia's Civil War is found in the archaeological record. In 1980, Samuel Doe, a member of the Indigenous Krahn ethnic group, toppled the 130-year settler political rule, executing the country's president, William Tolbert. After 9 years of Doe’s dictatorship, members of the Independent National Patriotic Front of Liberia (IMPFL), an offshoot of the National Patriotic Front of Liberia (NPFL), executed Samuel Doe. The leader of the NPFL, Charles Taylor, then took power and used violence to maintain it. Charles Taylor’s regime is marked by vicious warlords acting as politicians, the diamonds-for-arms trade, drug-influenced child soldiers, and other war crimes. An estimated 250,000 lives were taken by the 23 year conflict. In 2003, a ceasefire was called, and in 2005, an interim government elected Ellen Johnson Sirleaf. Taylor was then convicted of international war crimes in 2006. The impact of the war is seen within the archaeological record. AK-47 casings have been found on Providence Island as well as other BAHA excavated sites in Liberia. Bullet holes can be found all over Providence Island’s structures.

==== Impact of archaeology ====
Liberians have found deep meaning in its archaeological assemblages. The Liberian excavation team, staff of the National Museum, and the island’s groundskeepers saw physical proof that Indigenous Liberians have used the island before colonization. They saw the excavation of indigenous materials as a new avenue to uplift Indigenous perspectives and histories.

==== Future work ====
BAHA is continuing work on Providence Island. Artifact analysis is currently underway, with some materials being on display at the National Museum of Liberia. Work continues on sampling for luminescence dating to further understand the temporal frameworks on the Island and in Liberia as a whole.
