= The Independent (Gambia) =

- Type: Biweekly newspaper
- Editor-in-chief: Musa Saidykhan
- Managing editor: Alagi Yorro Jallow
- Founded: July 1999
- Language: English
- Ceased publication: March 2006
- Headquarters: Banjul, the Gambia
- Circulation: 10,000 (at peak)
- ISSN: 0796-1359

The Independent was a biweekly newspaper published in Banjul, the Gambia. The paper was started in July 1999 with 25 staffers and freelance reporters, but after multiple raids, acts of arbitrary arrest and detention, and unsolved acts of arson, The Independent ceased publication in March 2006.

== History of government harassment ==
Less than a month after the newspaper was founded, Gambia's National Intelligence Agency (NIA) raided its offices, arresting and detaining multiple journalists; the paper wasn't published for two weeks. In July 2000, Alagi Yorro Jallow, the managing editor and co-founder of the newspaper, was arrested and detained by the NIA after The Independent published an article about a hunger strike at Gambia's Central Prison. Jallow was arrested and harassed on multiple following occasions, and then in October 2003, the newspaper's offices were set on fire, partially destroying the newsroom.

The paper lost its printing press in an unsolved arson in April 2004, and was later forced to stop publishing after an informal arrangement with the pro-government newspaper The Daily Observer was terminated without explanation. Its editor Musa Saidykhan was notified by telephone on May 4, 2005 that the arrangement had ended, effective after its May 6 edition. According to the Committee to Protect Journalists, The Daily Observer Managing Editor Momodou Sanyang "made the decision after learning of problems with his paper's printing facilities, including the need for spare parts and extra capacity."

After two months, The Independent resumed as an underground publication using a "skeleton staff working in Gambia and a few determined reporters and editors elsewhere," After Saidykhan attended the African Editor’s Forum conference in Johannesburg, South Africa in October 2005, Saidykhan was arrested and detained by the NIA. According to Saidykhan, "the government was angered about a petition I had submitted to the former South African President Thabo Mbeki, inviting him to pressure a reluctant Gambian government expedite investigations into the gruesome murder of a leading local newspaper journalist, Deyda Hydara." Saidykhan has alleged he was tortured by the NIA in 2006. After plainclothes police officers stormed the newspaper's offices in March 2006 and arrested the newspaper's local staff, the newspaper ceased publication.
