= Palestinian Child's Day =

Annual observance

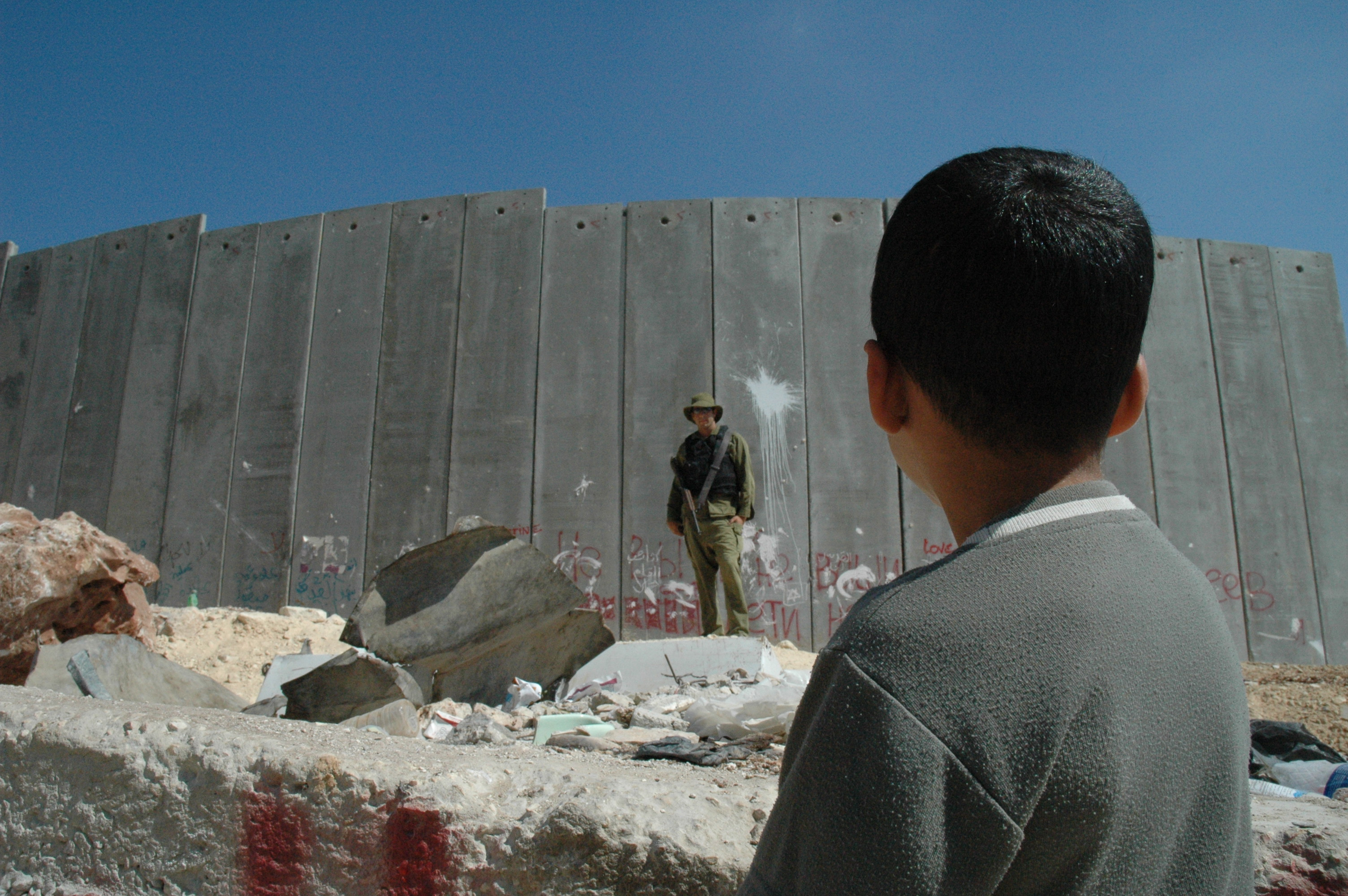
- A Palestinian boy and Israeli soldier in front of the Israeli West Bank barrier.
- Observed by: Palestinians
- Date: 5 April
- Next time: 5 April 2026
- Frequency: annual

Palestinian Child's Day (Arabic: يوم الطفل الفلسطيني; Hebrew: יום הילד הפלסטיני) is a day on which Palestinian children celebrate in the Occupied State of Palestine, on 5 April of each year.

== Date of celebration ==
The declaration of International Children's Day came when the late President Yasser Arafat declared his commitment to the Convention on the Rights of the Child, whereby Yasser Arafat declared 5 April a day for the Palestinian child. Note that the official ratification of the State of Palestine on the International Convention on the Rights of the Child was on 2 April 2014.

== The legal status of children in Palestine ==
There are general laws in the State of Palestine pertaining to the Palestinian child, such as the Palestinian Child Law No. (7) for the year 2004 AD and the decision by Law No. (4) for the year 2016 AD regarding the protection of juveniles, as these laws codify and limit the laws pertaining to the child with the aim of protecting him.

== Children in the Israeli-Palestinian Conflict ==
Children in the Israeli-Palestinian conflict refer to the impact of the Israeli-Palestinian conflict on minors in the Palestinian territories. Philip E. Verman found in an academic study that the IDF's response against Palestinian children was so strong that it "practically eliminates opportunities for effective child protection training." So that many children are brought up in refugee camps, and Daoud Kuttab described their conditions in the following way:

Children born in Palestinian refugee camps that are under Israeli occupation drink their mothers' milk while curfew is imposed on the camp; They wake up in the middle of the night to the sound of rubber bullets and rumors of a possible settler attack. When they grow up, they quickly learn the political lesson of the occupation. Soldiers, batons, tear gas, rubber bullets, arrests, torture, curfews, closure of camp entrances, administrative detention, and town arrests are all prominent entries in the daily dictionary of refugee camps.

=== Violence against children ===
Every year, approximately 700 Palestinian children between the ages of 12 and 17, the vast majority of whom are male, are arrested, interrogated, and detained by the Israeli army, Israeli police and Arabized forces.

== Photo gallery ==
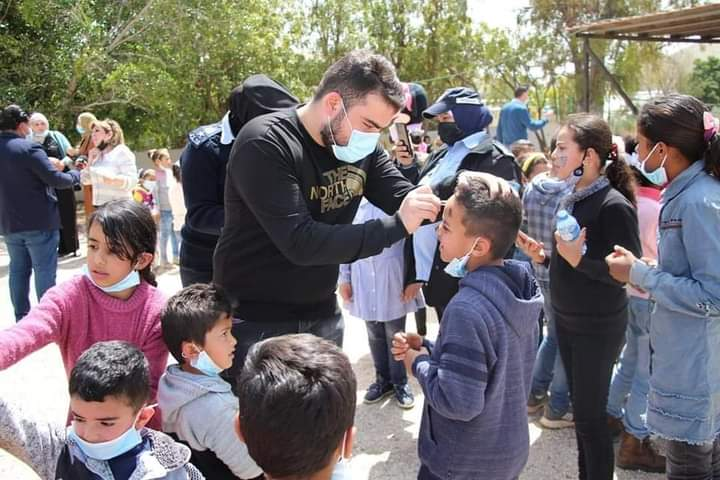

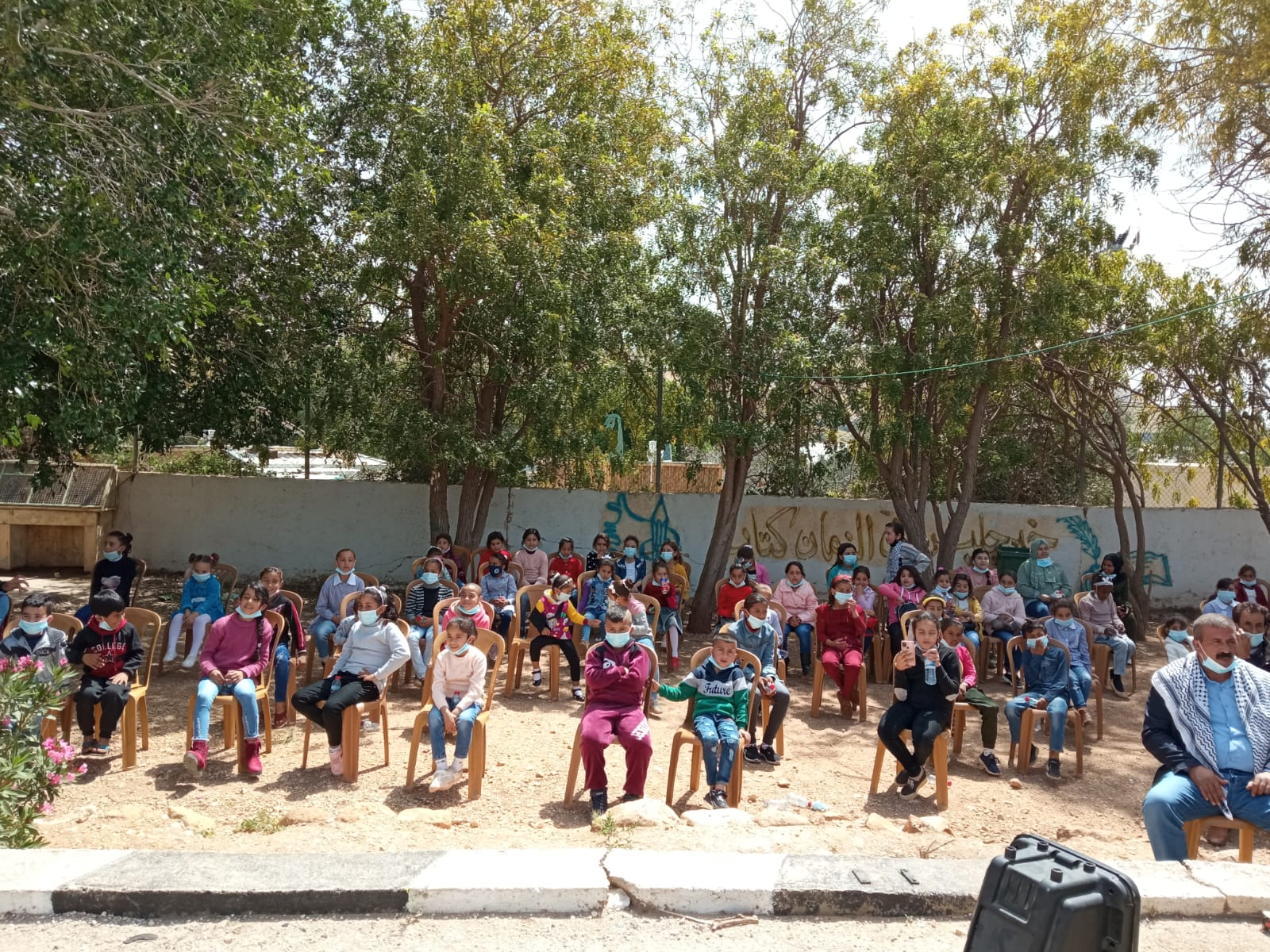

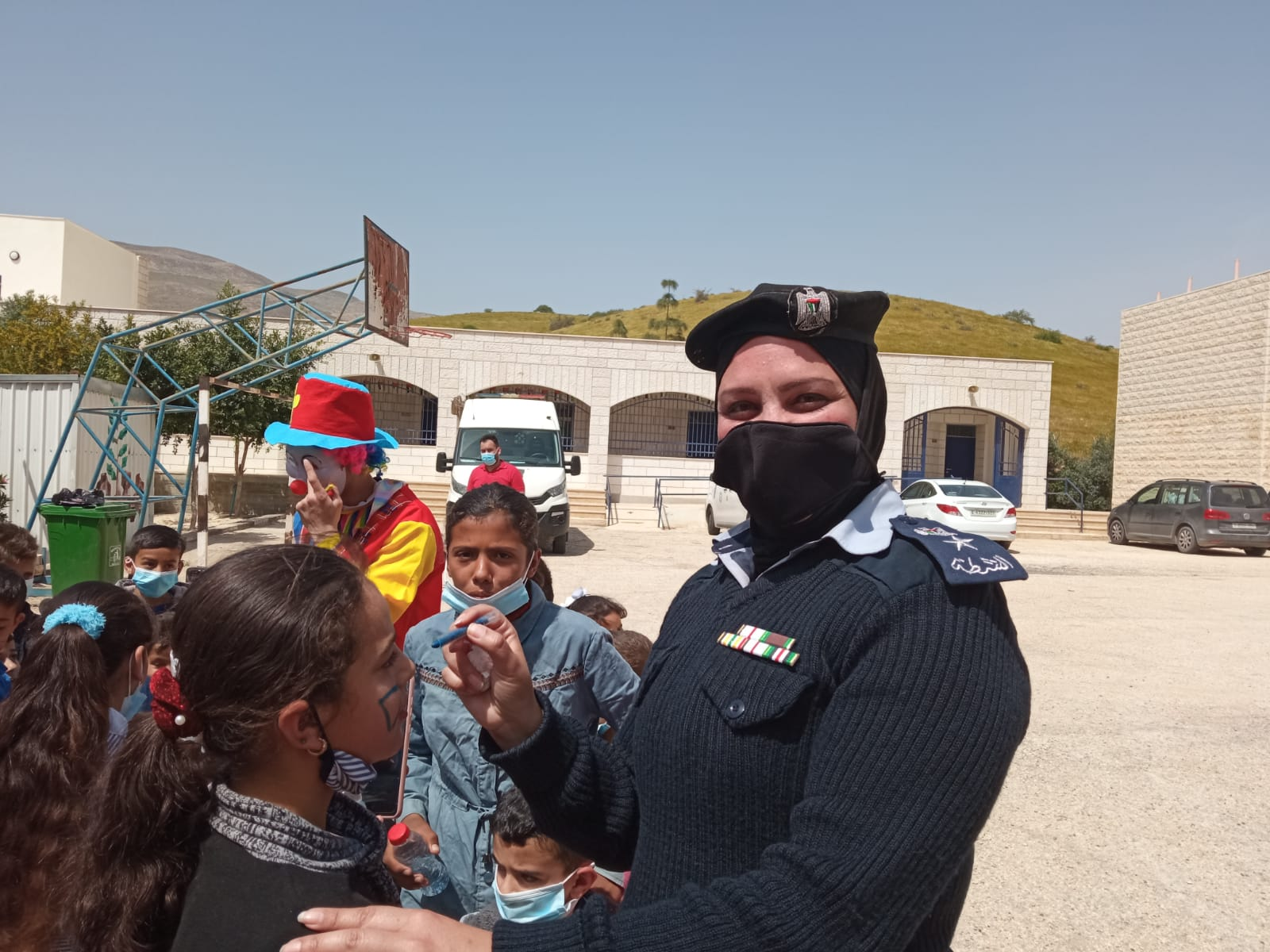

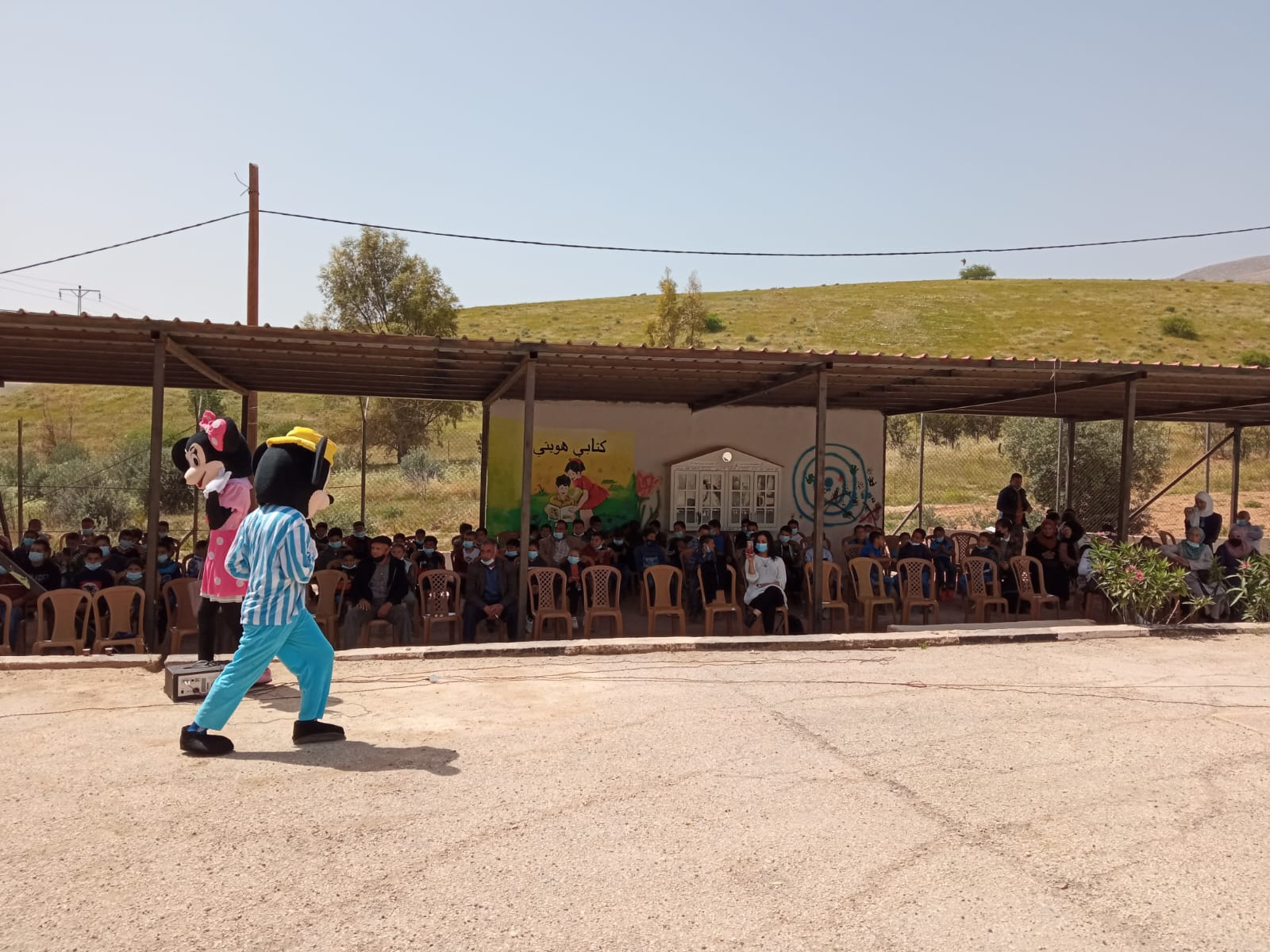

== See also ==
- Land Day
- International Day of Solidarity with the Palestinian People
- Nakba Day
- Children's Day
