= Amadou Scattred Janneh =

Gambian politician, dissident

- Born: 17 September 1962 (age 63); Gunjur village, Kombo South, the Gambia
- Occupations: politician, academic
- Known for: former Minister of Information, treason conviction

Amadou Scattred Janneh (born 17 September 1962) is a Gambian politician with Gambian and American dual citizenship. A former Minister of Information and Communication for the national government, he was sentenced to life in prison for treason after distributing T-shirts with the slogan "End to Dictatorship Now". After international protest from organizations including Amnesty International and an appeal by US activist Jesse Jackson, Janneh was pardoned and returned to the US.

== Background ==
Janneh was born in Gunjur village in the Kombo South district. He attended St. Augustine's High School, Banjul from 1974 to 1979, before starting in Mansa Konko as a clerical assistant. At the age of 17, he began working for Radio Gambia as a trainee reporter in June 1981. He later traveled to the U.S. in 1983, he gained a bachelor of arts in communication at Knoxville College in 1986. He then earned a master of arts in 1987 and a PhD in political science in 1990, both at the University of Tennessee. He then taught for ten years at the University of Tennessee until 2000, before moving to Savannah, Georgia, where he established a business of exporting and importing goods to and from Senegal.

Six months after Janneh's 2003 return to the Gambia to work as a political/economic assistant at the U.S. Embassy in Banjul, President Yahya Jammeh appointed him as Minister for Information, Communications and Technology in April 2004. Janneh was sacked by Jammeh from the post in July 2005 while attending an international conference in Nigeria.

While still a member of the Jammeh government, Janneh established Communication and Information Technology Enterprise (CommIT) in April 2005. The company was tasked to supply computers to companies in the private sector and later moved into real estate.

He together with other journalist in diaspora established the Coalition for Change–The Gambia (CGG) in April 2011, which aimed to bring together organisations involved in human rights activities to oppose Jammeh's government.

== Treason conviction ==
In May 2011, he purchased 100 T-shirts that had been produced by the group called Coalition for Change – The Gambia (CCG) and began to distributing it. Janneh was arrested on 5 June 2011 by National Intelligence Agency officials for distributing them. Three other activists - fellow Gambians Modou Keita and Ebrima Jallow and a Nigerian, Michael Uche Thomas - were arrested the same day. The four were detained at Mile 2 prison. Ndey Tapha Sosseh, a journalist, activist, and trade unionist, was also charged for her involvement in the T-shirts' printing, but was no longer in the country.

The four detainees were tried in November and December 2011. A number of witnesses testified for the prosecution that they had seen Janneh and the other defendants distributing the T-shirts. Police also presented e-mails in which CCG activists discussed how to change the national government.

On 18 January 2012, a Special Criminal Court found Janneh guilty of treason and conspiracy to commit a felony and gave him a life sentence. The judge, Emmanuel Nkea stated that he would have preferred to give Janneh a death sentence had it been permitted under Gambian law. Janneh, Keita, Jallow, and Thomas were also each sentenced to three years of hard labor for sedition. One of them, Michael Uche Thomas (a Nigerian national), died in prison of pneumonia in March 2012.

The anti-censorship group ARTICLE 19 described itself as "appalled" by the sentences and "deeply concerned by the state of freedom of expression in The Gambia". Amnesty International declared the four men prisoners of conscience and called for their immediate release, stating, "Gambia must stop such acts of persecution and allow criticism to be heard in the country."

Janneh was released in September 2012 following an appeal on his behalf by US activist and politician Jesse Jackson. Janneh returned to the US and stated that he would resume his IT business as well as work on a book.
