= Bushra al-Maqtari =

Yemeni writer and activist

Bushra al-Maqtari (Arabic: بشرى المقطري; born 1979) is a Yemeni writer and activist. She came to prominence as an anti-government protest leader in her hometown of Taiz during the 2011 Yemeni Revolution. As a writer, she is best known for her 2012 novel Behind the Sun and her 2018 nonfiction work What You Have Left Behind: Voices from the Land of the Forgotten War.

== Early life and education ==
Bushra al-Maqtari was born in 1979 in Taiz, Yemen. She spent some of her childhood in Saudi Arabia, where her father worked in construction. They were forced to leave in 1990, when a million Yemenis were expelled amid tensions between the two countries.

Maqtari studied history at Taiz University, graduating with a bachelor's degree.

== Career and activism ==
Maqtari is known for her work as a writer and activist. Her writing often focuses on the Yemeni Revolution and leftist politics in Yemen. She is considered a rare progressive, female voice in Yemen's conservative society. In response to her work, Yemeni clerics issued a fatwa against her and called for her to be excommunicated in January 2012. Protesters issued online threats against her and marched on her home.

Maqtari published her first book, the prose collection The Furthest Reaches of Pain, in 2003. She has written for both Arabic and English-language publications including The New Arab and the New York Times. In 2011, while covering a protest as a freelance reporter for the Mareb Press, she was injured by a grenade.

In 2011, she became a leader in anti-government protests during the Yemeni Revolution. The New York Times described her as "one of the first and most fearless leaders of the movement." Notably, she helped lead a protest march known as the "March for Life" from Taiz to Sanaa.

She published her first novel, Behind the Sun, in 2012. The book focuses on forced disappearances in Yemen. The following year, she was chosen as a participant in the International Prize for Arabic Fiction Nadwa, and was given the Françoise Giroud Award for Defense of Freedom and Liberties.

Her next book was 2015's South Yemen Under the Left, co-written with Fawwaz Traboulsi, which details the history of the Yemeni Socialist Party. This was followed in 2018 by her book What You Have Left Behind: Voices from the Land of the Forgotten War, described as an "impassioned raw account of the displaced, widowed and orphaned survivors of Yemen's war." The nonfiction work, which tells the stories of 43 different families, is based on her reporting across the country during the Yemeni Civil War. It was published in English by Fitzcarraldo Editions, with a translation by Sawad Hussain that won a PEN Translates award and was shortlisted for the 2023 Banipal Prize for Arabic Literary Translation.

In 2020, she was awarded the Johann Philipp Palm Award for Freedom of Speech and the Press, in honor of her work as an activist in Yemen. In 2024, she received the Tucholsky Prize from Swedish PEN for her work documenting the Yemeni Civil War.

As an academic, Maqtari worked at Taiz University and founded a historical research center in the city. She later became a researcher at the Sana'a Center for Strategic Studies. She has served on the executive board of the Yemeni Writers Union and as a member of the Central Committee of the Yemeni Socialist Party.

She continues to live and work in Yemen in spite of the fatwa against her, even after receiving invitations to emigrate to France and Sweden.

== Personal life ==
Maqtari's first marriage ended in divorce. She later married Sadeq Ali Ghanem.
