= Mahboubeh Abbasgholizadeh =

Iranian activist and filmmaker (born 1958)

- Born: 1958 (age 67–68); Khorramshahr, Khuzestan Province, Imperial State of Iran
- Occupations: Activist, Researcher and Filmmaker
- Known for: Activist

Mahboubeh Abbasgholizadeh (Persian: محبوبه عباسقلی‌زاده) is an Iranian women's rights activist, researcher, journalist and film-maker. She is a director of Zanan Broadcasting Network (www.zanantv.org), and an active member of the Stop Stoning Forever campaign and the Iranian Women's Charter movement. She has headed the Association of Women Writers and Journalists and was editor-in-chief of the women's studies journal Farzeneh. Since 2004, when her Non-Governmental Organisation Training Centre (NGOTC) was shut down, she has been arrested several times. In 2010, after she had left Iran for Europe, Iran's Revolutionary Court sentenced her to two and a half years in jail and 30 lashes for "acts against national security".

== Early life ==
Mahboubeh Abbasgholizadeh was born in Khoramshahr in southern Iran. She holds a BA in theology from Tehran University, a BA in Islamic Sciences from Islamic Azad University in Tehran and an MSc in Communication Sciences from Allameh Tabatabaee University in Tehran. She studied Arabic literature at Ain Shams University in Cairo. A participant in Iran's Islamic Revolution, she became interested in feminist readings of the Quran. Participating in a Quran reading group with Monir Gurji and Monir Amadi, she founded the Institute of Women's Studies and Research (IWSR) with them in 1986. She became editor of the institute's journal Farzaneh [Wise Woman] in 1993, continuing to edit it after she left the IWSR in 2003. In her editorial for Farzaneh's first issue, she argued the need for women's studies as a science which can aid women to live a good Islamic life. In 1997, faced with repression of women's publications by the Iranian judiciary, she founded the Association of Women Writers and Journalists. She has been active in the Women's Access to Public Stadiums campaign, the Stop Stoning Forever campaign, and the Iranian Women's Charter.

Security forces first arrested her on 1 November 2004, holding her for a month as a result of a speech she had delivered in Bangkok. Her personal effects were summarily seized and the Non-Governmental Organisation Training Centre (NGOTC), where she was Director, was shut down. She was arrested again on 4 March 2007, prior to International Women's Day, during a peaceful demonstration in front of Tehran's Revolutionary Court in solidarity with five women activists on trial for an earlier demonstration. This time she was held for over a month in Evin Prison. On 21 December 2009 she was arrested a third time, alongside others trying to attend the funeral of Grand Ayatollah Hosseinali Montazeri, a senior cleric who had criticised the Iranian government's crackdown on demonstrators in the aftermath of the contested June 2009 presidential elections. Released after 24 hours - on condition that she remove films she had made from the website of her collective - she left Iran for Europe. In May 2010 she was sentenced in absentia to 30 months in jail and 30 lashes for "acts against national security through conspiracy and collusion intended to disrupt public security, disturbing public order and defiance against government officers."

Mahboubeh Abbasgholizadeh was awarded the 2010 Johann Philipp Palm Prize for freedom of expression and the press. She is teaching a Women's Social Movements in Muslim Contexts in UConn.

== Works ==
=== Writing ===
- "Chirā Farzānah?" [Why Farzaneh?], ''Farzaneh 1 (Fall 1993)
- "The Experience of Islamic Feminism in Iran," Farzaneh 15, no. 10 (Winter 2000): 7-14

=== Films ===
- Women Behind Bars.
