= Madi Ceesay =

Gambian journalist

- Born: May 5, 1957 (age 69); Perai, The Gambia
- Occupations: Journalist, politician
- Years active: 1996–present
- Organization(s): The Independent (2006); Daily News
- Known for: President of the Gambia Press Union; CPJ International Press Freedom Award
- Title: Member of the National Assembly
- Political party: United Democratic Party
- Awards: CPJ International Press Freedom Award (2006)

Madi Ceesay is a Gambian journalist. He served as president of the Gambia Press Union, and was imprisoned and harassed for his journalistic work. According to the US-based Committee to Protect Journalists (CPJ), Ceesay's work has provided critical support for freedom of the press in Gambia, where journalists were frequently imprisoned and attacked.

== Early career ==
From 1996 until 2006, Ceesay worked for the Gambia News and Report. He first worked as a reporter, and later as deputy editor of the journal. Ceesay was arrested in 2000 for his coverage of the opposition political party the United Democratic Party.

== With The Independent ==
Ceesay became the general manager of The Independent in 2006. On 28 March 2006, government security forces closed the journal's offices and arrested staff; the Independent's staff speculated that the raid had been triggered by a column Ceesay had written criticizing all coups—both the 2006 coup attempt and President Yahya Jammeh's 1994 coup. Ceesay as well as the paper's editor, Musa Saidykhan, were imprisoned for three weeks without charge by the Gambian National Intelligence Agency.

The arrests were protested by Amnesty International, which initiated a letter-writing campaign on the men's behalf, calling for their release. Reporters Without Borders also called for the men's freedom, stating "Despite the promises it gave to the privately-owned press, Jammeh’s government continues to act in the way to which we are accustomed, with brutal repression."

Ceesay and Saidykhan were released on 20 April without a charge or an explanation for their detention. The Independent never re-opened. Later that year, Ceesay was awarded a CPJ International Press Freedom Award, which recognizes courage in defending press freedom despite facing attacks, threats, or imprisonment.

== Later work ==
Despite his brief imprisonment and the Independent's closure, Ceesay stated that he would continue working as a journalist: "somebody must do the job even though it is becoming increasingly difficult to do our duties". He later became the publisher the Daily News, which was also closed by Gambian authorities on 14 September 2012. Ceesay stated that Daily News management had repeatedly tried to meet with National Intelligence Agency officials to ask the reason for the closure, but none was given. On 17 September, Ceesay called on the government to "stop tightening its grip on the independent media", and stated that he would continue to publish despite the government order.
