= Johann Philipp Palm =

German bookseller and nationalist (1766–1806)

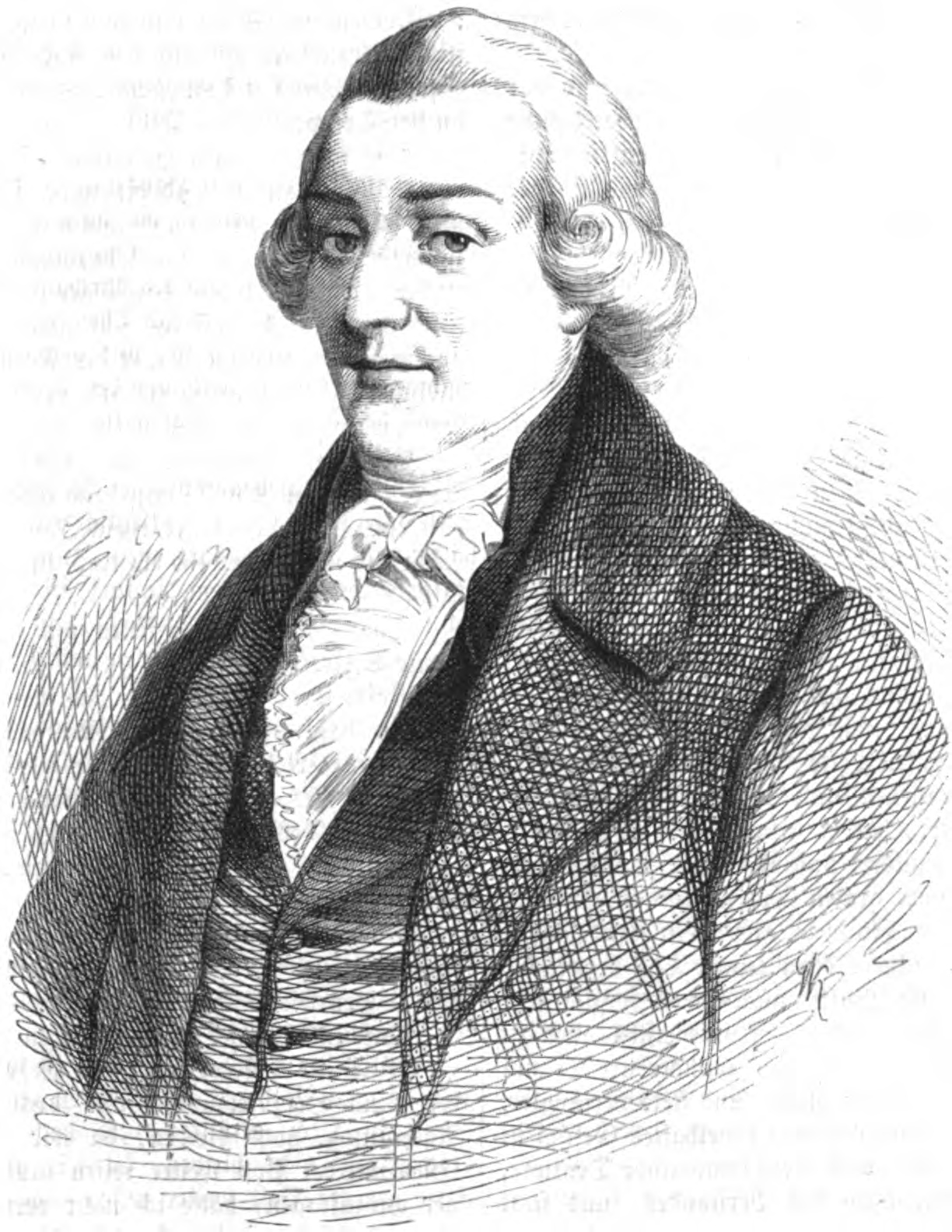
Johann Philipp Palm (G. Kühn, 1865)

Johann Philipp Palm or Johannes Philipp Palm (18 December 1766 – 26 August 1806) was a German bookseller and a strong anti-French agitator and freedom fighter executed during the Napoleonic Wars at Napoleon's orders.

He was born at Schorndorf in Württemberg. Having been apprenticed to his uncle, the publisher Johann Jakob Palm (1750–1826), in Erlangen, he married the daughter of the bookseller Stein in Nuremberg, and in the course of time became proprietor of his father-in-law's business.

In the spring of 1806, the Stein publishing house sent to the bookselling establishment of Stage in Augsburg a pamphlet (presumably written by Philipp Christian Yelin in Ansbach) entitled Deutschland in seiner tiefen Erniedrigung (German: Germany in her deep humiliation), which strongly attacked Napoleon and the behaviour of the French troops in Bavaria. On learning of the violent rhetorical attack made upon his régime and failing to discover the actual author, Napoleon had Palm arrested in and handed over to a military commission at Braunau am Inn on the Bavarian-Austrian frontier, with peremptory instructions to try the prisoner and execute him within twenty-four hours. Palm was denied the right of defence, and after a show trial on 25 August 1806, he was shot the following day without having betrayed the pamphlet's author.

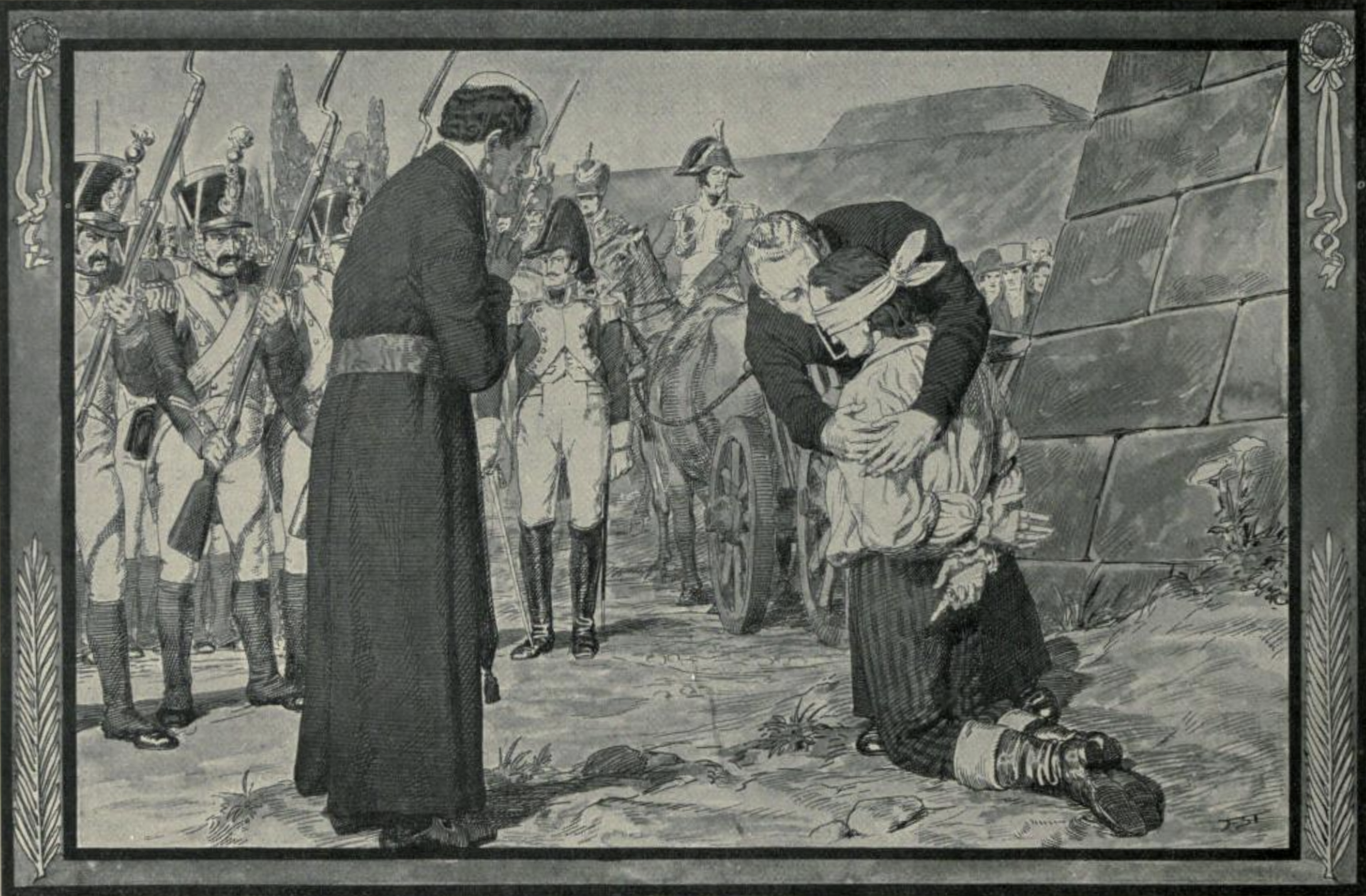
Execution of Johann Philipp Palm in Branau on 26 August 1806 (Richard Knötel, c. 1901)

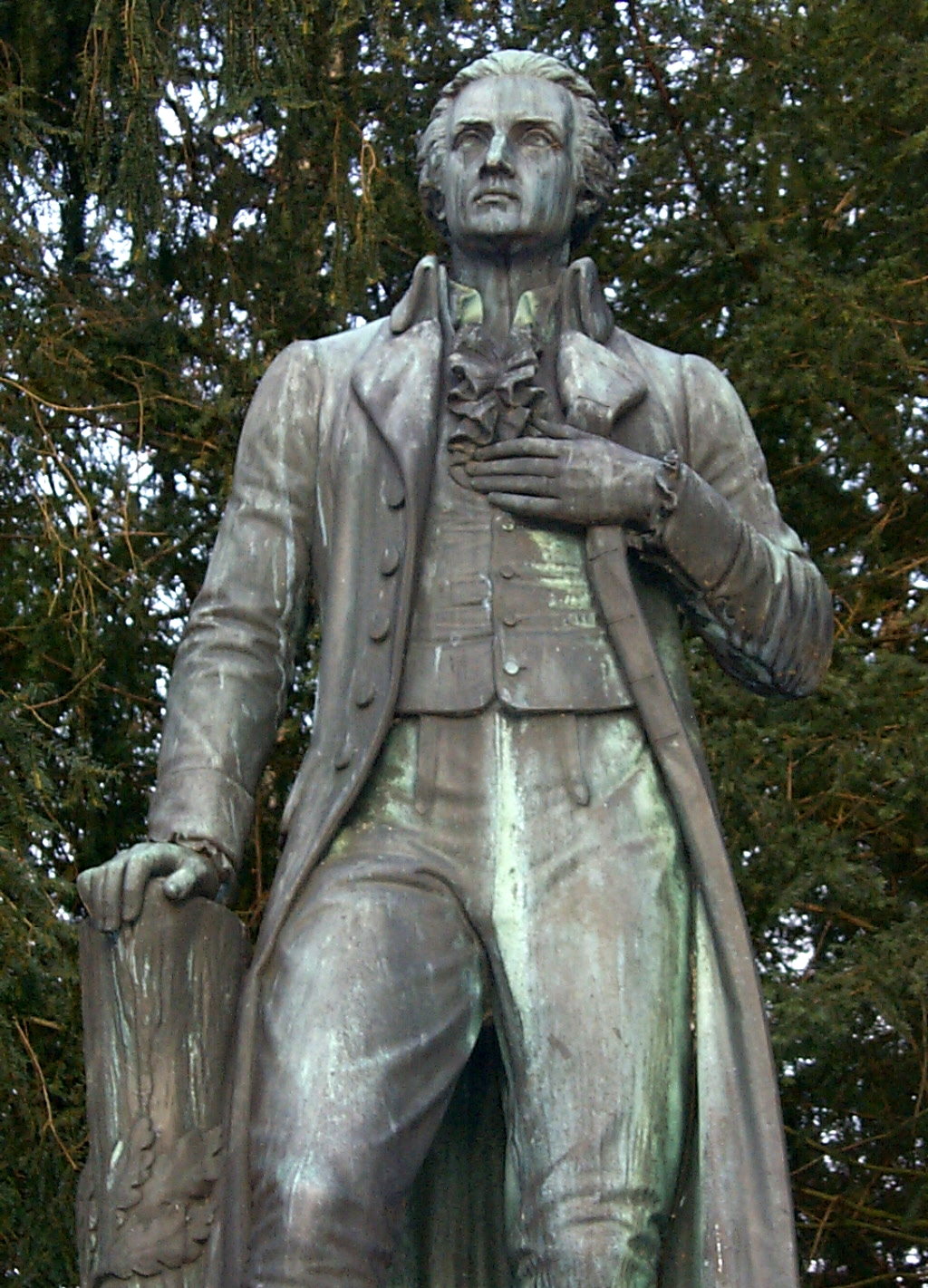
Statue by Konrad Knoll, Braunau, 1866

A life-size bronze statue was erected to his memory in Braunau in 1866, and on the centenary of his death, numerous patriotic meetings were held throughout Bavaria. Since 2002 a private foundation at Schorndorf has awarded a Johann Philipp Palm Prize for freedom of speech and the press.

According to a famous anecdote, it was to Palm that the poet Thomas Campbell was referring when he gave his famous toast to Napoleon at a literary dinner. When this caused uproar, he admitted, "The Emperor is a usurper, the enemy of our country, and if you will of the whole human race. But, gentlemen, let us be just to our great enemy. Let us not forget that he once shot a bookseller."

Palm is briefly mentioned in Adolf Hitler's autobiography Mein Kampf (German: My Struggle), in the first page of the book. Hitler wrote, "To-day I consider it a good omen that Destiny appointed Braunau-am-Inn to be my birthplace." Later on the same page, Palm is mentioned by name as an "uncompromising nationalist and enemy of the French, put to death here because he had loved Germany even in her misfortune." Hitler compares his death to that of Leo Schlageter, who had also been executed by the French after being betrayed to them.

== Johann Philipp Palm Prize laureates ==
- 2002: Sihem Bensedrine (Tunisia) and Christian Führer (Germany)
- 2004: Sergei Duvanov (Kazakhstan) and Jamila Mujahed (Afghanistan)
- 2006: Pap Saine, The Point (Gambia) and Asya Tretyuk (Belarus)
- 2008: Seyran Ateş (Germany) and Itai Mushekwe (Zimbabwe)
- 2010: Mahboubeh Abbasgholizadeh (Iran) and Pedro Matías Arrazola (Mexico)
- 2012: Alaa Al Aswany (Egypt) and Hrant Dink (Turkey)
- 2014: Nazeeha Said (Bahrain) and Salijon Abdurahmanov (Uzbekistan)
- 2016: Inès Lydie Gakiza (Burundi) and Akademiker für den Frieden (Barış İçin Akademisyenler bildirisi, Turkey)
- 2018: Štefica Galić (Bosnia) and Josephine Achiro Fortelo (South Sudan)
- 2020: Bushra al-Maqtari (Yemen) and Gui Minhai (China)
- 2022: Alexei Venediktov (Russia) and the Congolese radio and television network Coracon (Democratic Republic of Congo)
