= Ebrima Manneh =

Gambian missing journalist

- Born: February 18, 1978; Lamin, Western Division
- Died: Probably mid-2008 Allegedly in The Gambia
- Occupation: Journalist
- Organization: Daily Observer (1998-2006)
- Known for: 2006 disappearance
- Awards: Amnesty International Special Award for journalism under threat (2009)

Ebrima B. Manneh (February 18, 1978–2008?) was a Gambian journalist who was arrested in July 2006 and secretly held in custody. In March 2019, the Gambian newspapers The Trumpet and The Point reported that Manneh died in mid-2008 while being taken from a police station to the Diabugu Batapa hospital. It is said that he was buried behind the local police station.

== Background ==
A Daily Observer reporter, Manneh was reportedly arrested by state security after attempting to republish a BBC report criticizing President Yahya Jammeh shortly before an African Union meeting in Banjul; his arrest was witnessed by coworkers. Though ordered to release Manneh by an Economic Community Of West African States court, the Gambian government has denied that Manneh is imprisoned. According to AFP, an unnamed police source confirmed Manneh's arrest in April 2009, but added he believed Manneh "is no longer alive". In June 2009, Manneh received the Special Award for journalism under threat from Amnesty International.

== Disappearance ==
The Gambia Echo newspaper reported on January 13, 2007, that Manneh was in the Fatoto police station in December 2006. He is said to have been detained in various police stations in the country in the last five months before that, the last three in Fatoto. Meanwhile, human rights organizations, including Reporters Without Borders, had drafted a petition to Gambian President Jammeh to secure Manneh's release. In recent months, the government had continued to deny knowing anything about Manneh's whereabouts. In late February 2007, a police spokesman spoke publicly about the Manneh case for the first time. However, this should never have been stopped at the named police stations. The police said they had received relevant statements from the population regarding Manneh's whereabouts.

When a journalist was investigating in April 2007, Manneh was no longer in Fatoto; it is said that he was relocated to an unknown destination in February. While police said they knew nothing about him, it was suggested that he had been transferred to Kombo at the time.

On March 16, 2011, President Jammeh is said to have made a statement to representatives of the press. At the time, he claimed that the government had nothing to do with Chief Manneh's death ("Let me make it very clear that the government has nothing to do with Chief Manneh's death"). Rumors of the death spread as early as June 2009.

Amnesty International considers him to be a prisoner of conscience and named him a 2011 "priority case". The Committee to Protect Journalists has also called for his release and demanded that authorities account for his disappearance. The Committee described his arrest as part of "a climate of fear created by the unsolved murder of prominent Gambian editor Deyda Hydara, a series of unsolved arsons of media houses, and a pattern of government intimidation and prosecution of journalists."

In January 2017, his family was informed of his death. They were not given any information as to how he had died nor who was responsible. In November that same year, the government of Gambia showed they were ready to compensate Manneh's family for the violation of rights by Yahya Jammeh's administration. The payment was to comply with the rulings of the Economic Community of West African States (ECOWAS) Court of Justice.

In March 2019, The Point newspaper reported that Manneh died in mid-2008, while being transported from a police station to Diabugu Batapa hospital. It is said that he was buried behind the local police station.

== See also ==
- List of people who disappeared mysteriously: post-1970
