= Štefica Galić =

Štefica Galić Штефица Галић
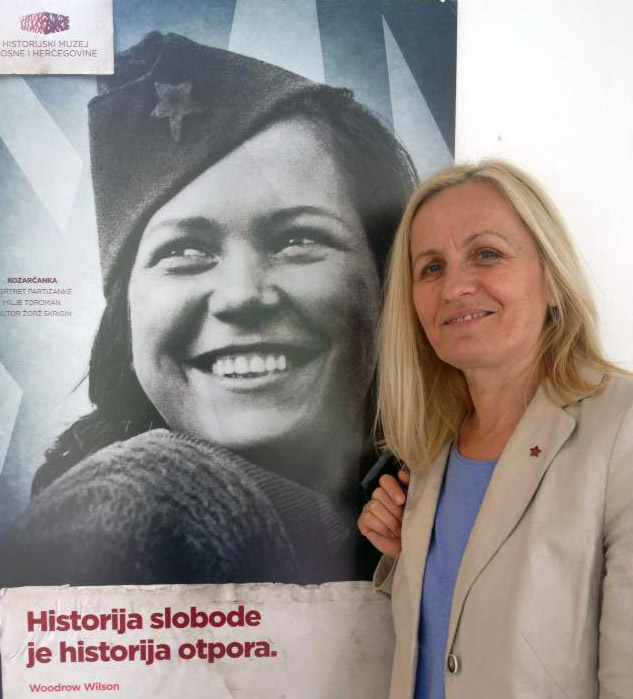
- Galić posing next to the Kozarčanka photograph
- Born: 16 March 1963 (age 62); Mali Ograđenik, SR Bosnia and Herzegovina, SFR Yugoslavia
- Occupations: Photography, journalism
- Employer: Tačno.net
- Known for: Rescue of Bosniak civil victims out of Herzeg-Bosnian camps during the Croat–Bosniak War
- Title: Editor-in-chief
- Term: 2010–present
- Spouse: Nedjeljko "Neđo" Galić (died 2001)
- Children: 3
- Awards: 2018 Johann Philipp Palm Prize
- Website: https://www.tacno.net/

Štefica Galić (Serbo-Croatian Cyrillic: Штефица Галић; born 16 March 1963) is a Bosnian journalist and human rights activist. During the Croat–Bosniak War, Galić saved about a thousand people from internment in a detention camp. She is a vocal critic of nationalist politics. Since September 2019, Štefica Galić has been protected by the Bundestag.

== Wartime activities ==
Štefica Galić is an ethnic Croat from the Herzegovinian town of Ljubuški, in southern Bosnia and Herzegovina. In 1992, the Croat–Bosniak War broke out, part of the larger Bosnian War and the more larger Yugoslav Wars. The Bosniaks of Ljubuški were rounded up by the Croatian Defence Council on 15 August 1993. Štefica Galić and her husband, photographer Nedjeljko "Neđo" Galić, worked to prevent the deportation of the Bosniaks of Ljubuški to the detention camps of Dretelj, Gabela, and Heliodrom. The Galićs falsified affidavits for the people interned in the camps to prove they had a relation outside of Bosnia and Herzegovina they could move to rather than stay at the camps. According to the testimonies gathered by the Gardens of the Righteous Worldwide organization, the couple rescued about a thousand people from camps, two thirds of the total Bosniak population of Ljubuški.

Repulsed by the treatment of their fellow denizens, the Galićs moved with their three children to Prague, Czech Republic, in late 1993. They refused the benefits accorded to refugees, insisting that they were not the expelled ones. Homesickness forced them to return to Ljubuški a year later, where they were stigmatized as Yugo-nostalgics and "commies". Supporters have praised Štefica Galić as the "Schindler of Ljubuški". In 2019, Galić published an article about the murder of civilians in Ljubuški in 1993.

== Journalism ==
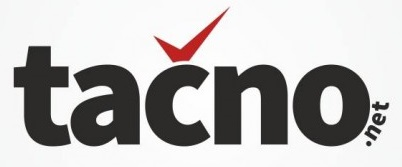
Logo of the online magazine Tačno.net, established by Galić in 2010.

After her husband's death in 2001, Galić became a journalist. Following the airing of Svetlana Broz's film about the rescue of the Bosniaks of Ljubuški in July 2012, Galić was physically assaulted by a war veterans' association activist. The attack was condemned by the United States, European Union, and OSCE representatives. Posters placed around the town branded them "enemies of the Croatian people". Two years later, Galić left Ljubuški and moved to Mostar, where she also receives threats.

Since 2010, Galić has been the editor-in-chief of the independent online magazine Tačno.net, which opposes ethnic nationalism in Bosnia and Herzegovina and features authors from other former Yugoslav republics as well. Galić has stated that she is inspired by Feral Tribune and BH Dani. She acknowledges the discrimination against women in journalism, but says that the nationalism-inspired assaults on her have made her oblivious to it.

In 2017, Galić signed the Declaration on the Common Language of the Croats, Serbs, Bosniaks and Montenegrins.

Galić won the International Johann Philipp Palm Award for Freedom of Speech and the Press 2018.
