= Albert Porte =

Liberian journalist

- Born: January 19, 1906; Crozerville, Liberia
- Died: 1986 (aged 79–80)
- Education: Cuttington University College
- Known for: First Liberian journalist to be imprisoned by President Tubman
- Relatives: Kenneth Best (nephew)
- Awards: Humane Order of African Redemption Knight (posthumous)

Albert Porte (19 January 1906 – 1986) was an Americo-Liberian political journalist and dissident who was the editor of the Crozerville Observer. In 1946, he became the first Liberian journalist to be imprisoned by President William Tubman. The first major movement toward civil society in Liberia is traced back to Porte's activities.

== Background ==
Descended from Barbadians who emigrated to Liberia in 1865, Porte was born on January 16, 1906, in Crozerville, Liberia. The Porte family is from Barbados. He was educated at the Christ Church Parish Day School in Crozerville, the College of West Africa in Monrovia, and Cuttington University College.

Before his political journalism career, Porte was a public school teacher. He later served as executive secretary of the National Teachers Association, and edited the NTA Bulletin.

Porte's political activist career began in the 1920s when he distributed pamphlets that took the True Whig Party single-party-state government to task for alleged unconstitutional use of presidential power.

He published articles in the Crozerville Observer, as well as other Liberian print media and foreign press. His most famous publications are the leaflets and pamphlets Thinking about Unthinkable Things—The Democratic Way (1967), Liberianization or Gobbling Business? (1975), Explaining Why (1976), Thoughts on Change (1977) and The Day Monrovia Stood Still (1979). Porte was imprisoned multiple times, and harassed and hounded by the government from the 1920s.

In the 1970s, Porte took aim at Finance Minister Stephen Allen Tolbert, the brother of President William Tolbert and co-founder of the first Liberian-owned multimillion-dollar conglomerate, the Mesurado Group of Companies. He accused the minister of using his public office stature to advance his business interests, penning a piece called "Liberianization of Gobbling Business?" Minister Tolbert filed a libel lawsuit and won a US$250,000 judgment against Porte in a case presided over by Supreme Court Justice James A. A. Pierre, the father-in-law of Minister Tolbert. The resulting public outrage led to the creation of what is considered Liberia's first civil society organization, Citizens of Liberia in Defense of Albert Porte (COLIDAP).

Porte died in 1986. On July 24, 2008, Porte posthumously received the Knight Great Band Humane Order of African Redemption award from the Liberian government for his contributions to Liberia.

He was the uncle of Kenneth Best, the founder of the Liberian Observer, one of the oldest extant daily newspapers in Liberia.
