= Grémah Boucar =

Nigerien journalist (1959–2022)

Grémah Boucar, also known as Grémah Boukar Koura, is a Nigerien journalist.

Boucar was born February 2, 1959, in Maïné-Soroa, Niger. He launched Agence Anfani, the Anfani media group, in 1989, founding Anfani magazine in January 1992, and Radio Anfani FM 100MHZ in 1994, with the goal of breaking the government's broadcast monopoly. As 70% of the Nigerien population is illiterate, radio is the primary way Niger receives news, and the station became the nation's primary news source, providing international news as an affiliate of the Voice of America, BBC World Service, and Radio Deutsche Welle, and local coverage through a staff of investigative journalists.

After the January 1996 military coup by Ibrahim Baré Maïnassara against Niger's first democratically elected president, Mahamane Ousmane, Radio Anfani became a target of government harassment. In July 1996, soldiers vandalized the station and shut it down for a month, in retaliation for its coverage of the political opposition. In March 1997, five men in military uniforms ransacked the station and destroyed US$80,000 of newly installed equipment; in the following weeks, Boucar, three journalists, and two security guards were arrested, and Boucar and one guard were charged with organizing the attack themselves to attract international donations. In the summer of 1998, Boucar was kidnapped from his home and threatened with death.

== Awards ==
In 1998, Boucar was awarded a CPJ International Press Freedom Award from the Committee to Protect Journalists. In 1999, he won a Hellman/Hammett grant from Human Rights Watch. In 2000, he was awarded the International Press Institute World Press Freedom Hero award.

Boucar's Anfani group gets support from the National Endowment for Democracy.
