= International Press Institute World Press Freedom Heroes =

Individuals recognized with press award

International Press Institute World Press Freedom Heroes are individuals who have been recognized by the Vienna-based International Press Institute for "significant contributions to the maintenance of press freedom and freedom of expression" and "indomitable courage". The first 50 "heroes" were selected on the occasion of the organization's 50th anniversary in 2000, and awarded at its World Congress in Boston. As of 2021, 22 additional heroes have been added to the list, several of them posthumously.

== Recipients ==
Year	Honorees	Country
2000	Aslam Ali	Pakistan
2000	Rudolf Augstein	Germany
2000	Omar Belhouchet	Algeria
2000	Kenneth Best	Liberia
2000	Hubert Beuve-Méry	France
2000	Jesús Blancornelas	Mexico
2000	Grémah Boukar Koura	Niger
2000	Jose Burgos Jr.	Philippines
2000	Guillermo Cano	Colombia
2000	Juan Pablo Cárdenas	Chile
2000	Pedro Joaquín Chamorro	Nicaragua
2000	Suk-Chae Choi	South Korea
2000	Julio De Mesquita Neto	Brazil
2000	Jiří Dienstbier	Czech Republic
2000	Harold Evans	United Kingdom
2000	Antonio Fontán	Spain
2000	Gao Yu	China
2000	Katharine Graham	United States
2000	Veronica Guerin	Ireland
2000	Shiro Hara	Japan
2000	Amira Hass	Israel
2000	Tara Singh Hayer	Canada
2000	Doan Viet Hoat	Vietnam
2000	Abdi İpekçi	Turkey
2000	Kemal Kurspahić	Bosnia and Herzegovina
2000	Daoud Kuttab	Palestine
2000	Gwen Lister	Namibia
2000	Mochtar Lubis	Indonesia
2000	Kronid Lyubarsky	Russia
2000	Savea Sano Malifa	Samoa
2000	Veran Matić	Serbia
2000	Adam Michnik	Poland
2000	Fred M'membe	Zambia
2000	Indro Montanelli	Italy
2000	Nizar Nayyouf	Syria
2000	Freedom Neruda	Ivory Coast
2000	Pius Njawé	Cameroon
2000	Germán Ornes	Dominican Republic
2000	Percy Qoboza	South Africa
2000	Raúl Rivero	Cuba
2000	Nuno Rocha	Portugal
2000	Faraj Sarkohi	Iran
2000	Arun Shourie	India
2000	André Sibomana	Rwanda
2000	U Thaung	Myanmar
2000	Jacobo Timerman	Argentina
2000	Ricardo Uceda	Peru
2000	Eleni Vlahou	Greece
2000	C.E.L. Wickremesinghe	Sri Lanka
2000	José Rubén Zamora	Guatemala
2006	Anna Politkovskaya	Russia
2007	Hrant Dink	Turkey
2010	Lydia Cacho Ribeiro	Mexico
2010	May Chidiac	Lebanon
2010	Akbar Ganji	Iran
2010	Yoani Sánchez	Cuba
2010	Pap Saine	The Gambia
2010	Nedim Şener	Turkey
2010	Lasantha Wickrematunge	Sri Lanka
2010	Laurence Gandar	South Africa
2011	Raymond Louw	South Africa
2011	Daniel Pearl	United States
2012	David Rohde	United States
2013	Marie Colvin	United States
2013	Mika Yamamoto	Japan
2014	Mashallah Shamsolvaezin	Iran
2015	Mazen Darwish	Syria
2016	Ahmad Zeidabadi	Iran
2017	Eskinder Nega	Ethiopia
2019	Cyril Almeida	Pakistan
2021	Yuliya Slutskaya	Belarus
