= Deyda Hydara =

Gambian editor

- Born: June 9, 1946; Barra, Gambia
- Died: December 16, 2004 (aged 58); Kanifing, Gambia
- Cause of death: Gunshot wounds
- Occupation: Editor of The Point
- Known for: Journalism, 2004 murder
- Awards: PEN/Barbara Goldsmith Freedom to Write Award (2005); Hero of African Journalism Award (2010)

Deyda Hydara (June 9, 1946 – December 16, 2004) was co-founder and primary editor of The Point, a major independent Gambian newspaper. He worked as a radio presenter for Radio Syd during his early years as a freelance journalist before becoming a correspondent for AFP News Agency and Reporters Without Borders.

He was known for unwavering commitment to press freedom and freedom of expression, and a vocal critic of then-President Yahya Jammeh. In 2004, after announcing his intentions to challenge newly passed legislation targeting press and speech through judicial means, he was assassinated by unknown assailants in Banjul; the murder was left unsolved for years, with international organizations demanding proper ascertainment and justice. Jammeh made little to no effort to assuage the public's anger.

The Gambia Press Union criticized the national government and ran their statements through The Point and Foroyaa. In response, the Jammeh government arrested six of the journalists at these papers, including Pap Saine; they were sentenced to two years of imprisonment in 2009 and fined over $5,000.

In 2014, a court of ECOWAS ruled in favor of the family, who had filed suit against the government for negligence, and ordered restitution; Jammeh's administration ignored the ruling. Adama Barrow replaced Jammeh as the next president, and since then there was some progress: arrest warrants were issued for two army officers as suspects in 2017, and later a TRRC heard testimonies that Jammeh was implicated in the murder, though he has not been indicted.

== Journalism with The Point ==
On December 16, 1991, Hydara co-founded The Point along with Pap Saine and Babucarr Gaye; Saine and Hydara had been friends since childhood. Gaye resigned four months later, and Hydara and Saine ran the paper together for the next decade.

== Advocacy ==
Hydara was an advocate of press freedom and critical of the government of then-President Yahya Jammeh, who was openly hostile to Gambian journalists and the media. On December 14, 2004, the Gambia passed two new media laws. One, the Criminal Code (Amendment) Act of 2004, allowed prison terms for defamation and sedition; the other, the Newspaper (Amendment) Act of 2004, required newspaper owners to purchase expensive operating licenses, registering their homes as security. Hydara fiercely opposed these bills.

== Murder ==
Hydara announced his intent to challenge the Criminal Code and Newspaper bills in court, but on December 16, 2004, he was assassinated by an unknown gunman while driving home from work in Banjul. Two of his colleagues were also injured. Over the following years, the Gambian government was the target of criticism for its failure to properly field an investigation and for intimidating those who made such criticisms.

Deyda Hydara was survived by his wife and his five children. He was posthumously awarded the PEN/Barbara Goldsmith Freedom to Write Award in 2005. In 2010, he won the Hero of African Journalism Award of The African Editors' Forum in 2010, sharing the latter with disappeared journalist Ebrima Manneh.

== Investigation controversy and defamation trial ==
In November 2008, the International Press Institute began a "Justice Denied" campaign pressing for investigations into violence against journalists in the Gambia, particularly the still-unsolved murder of Deyda Haydara. At a June 2009 press conference, Gambian President Yahya Jammeh disparaged questions about the Hydara investigation, saying "And up to now one of these stupid Web sites carries 'Who Killed Deyda Hydara'? Let them go and ask Deyda Hydara who killed him." Although the killers have not yet been charged, it is believed by some that the former government in the Republic of Gambia may have been responsible for the act.

The Gambia Press Union then published a statement criticizing the lack of press freedom in Gambia, the stalled progress of the investigation, and the president's remarks, which the union called "inappropriate". The statement ran in The Point and a weekly newspaper, Foroyaa, on June 11, 2009.

The Gambian government responded by arresting six journalists: Pap Saine, News Editor Ebrima Sawaneh, reporters Sarata Jabbi-Dibba and Pa Modou Faal of The Point, and editor Sam Saar and reporters Emil Touray of Foroyaa. The six were charged with sedition and criminal defamation of the president. Jabbi-Dibba (the only woman) was held in Mile 2 prison, while Saine, Sawaneh, Faal, Saar, and Touray were held in Old Jeshwang prison. On August 8, Jabbi-Dibba's seven-month-old baby was taken away.

Numerous human rights NGOs protested the arrests and called the charges against the journalists to be dropped. Amnesty International designated the six as prisoners of conscience and demanded their immediate release. The Committee to Protect Journalists also campaigned for Saine's release, as did the World Organization Against Torture, the International Federation for Human Rights, International PEN, the PEN American Center, and Front Line Defenders. Jammeh continued to denounce the journalists, however, making a state television appearance to say "So they think they can hide behind so-called press freedom and violate the law and get away with it? They got it wrong this time ... We are going to prosecute them to the letter."

On August 7, 2009, the six were convicted and sentenced to two years' imprisonment in Mile 2 Prison, as well as a fine of 250,000 dalasi (£5,780) apiece. However, Jammeh pardoned them in September, following a campaign of "domestic and international pressure". The pardons were issued to coincide with Ramadan.

On November 29, 2025, a suspect who formerly served in the Jammeh regime's paramilitary force, the "Junglers", was arrested in Senegal and charged with Hydara's murder. He was extradited to the Gambia on December 2, 2025.

== Lawsuit ==
In June 2014, a decade after his assassination, the ECOWAS Community Court of Justice found the Gambian government liable for failing to diligently investigate Deyda Hydara's murder. The Nigerian law firm, Aluko & Oyebode, represented the family of Deyda Hydara and the Africa Regional Office of the International Federation of Journalists (IFJ-Africa) in the lawsuit against the Gambian government.

Hydara's family filed a lawsuit against the government for negligence, and an ECOWAS court ruled in favour of the family in 2014, awarding them $60,000 in damages and legal fees, although the government has not yet complied with the ruling. His murder remains unsolved, although in May 2017 (after Adama Barrow replaced Yahya Jammeh as President), arrest warrants were issued for two army officers as suspects.

== TRRC ==
In testimony before the Truth, Reconciliation and Reparations Commission (TRRC), in Banjul on July 22, 2019, Lt Malick Jatta said that Hydara was shot on the orders of Jammeh.

A final 2021 report recommended prosecuting those responsible, including Jammeh; however, no one has been charged or prosecuted.

== See also ==
- List of unsolved murders (2000–present)
