= Daoud Kuttab =

Palestinian journalist

- داود كتّاب
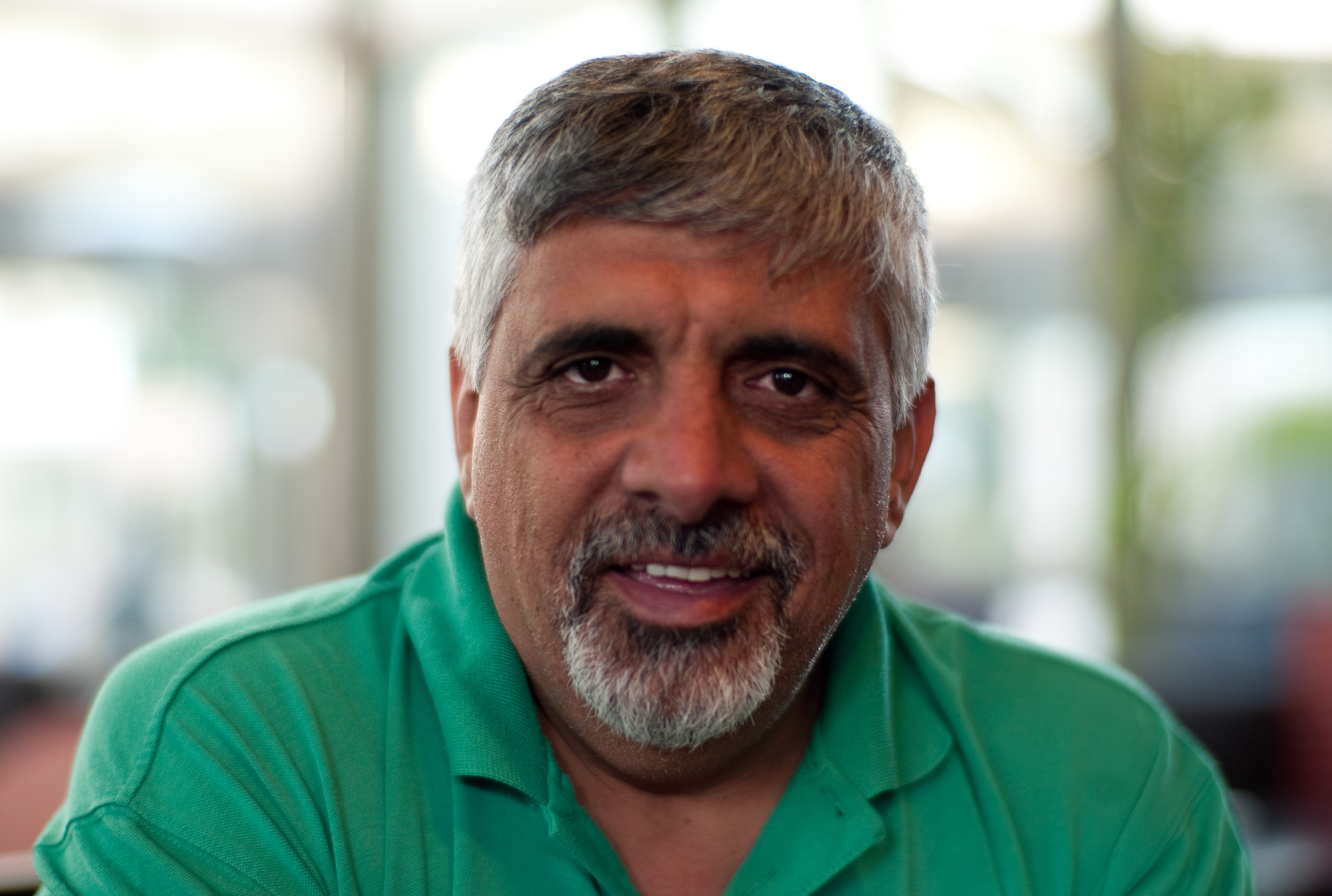
- Born: April 1, 1955 (age 71); Bethlehem, Palestine
- Occupation: Journalist
- Awards: CPJ International Press Freedom Award (1996); World Press Freedom Hero (2000)

Daoud Kuttab (Arabic: داود كتّاب; born 1 April 1955) is a Palestinian-American journalist.

== Journalism ==
In 1980, Kuttab began his career at Al-Fajr, an English-language weekly newspaper. Over the next seven years, he was promoted to features editor and then managing editor. In 1987, he left Al-Fajr for Al-Quds, an Arabic-language daily newspaper based in East Jerusalem. He also contributed to The Jerusalem Post. During this period, he became the first Palestinian to receive an exclusive interview with Yitzhak Rabin, as well as from Shimon Peres and several other Israeli leaders.

Kuttab was critical of press censorship by both the Israel government and the Palestinian Authority. On several occasions, he participated in rallies against Israeli censorship, resulting in his being arrested and searched. In 1994, Kuttab led journalists to rally in protest of the banning of the daily newspaper Al-Nahar by the Palestinian National Authority. Al-Quds subsequently fired Kuttab at the direct order of President Yasir Arafat. Kuttab continued to work as a journalist, however, writing for papers including The Daily Telegraph, Daily Yomuri, International Herald Tribune, Los Angeles Times, The New York Times, and The Washington Post. In April 1996, he also created the Arabic Media Internet Network, an online magazine for uncensored Palestinian journalism.

In May 1997, Kuttab was detained without charge by Arafat's government, reportedly for producing live broadcasts of Palestinian Legislative Council meetings. He was released one week later following local and international pressure.

In March 2022, Kuttab was briefly detained by Jordanian authorities following a complaint regarding an article he had published in 2019 about the detention of an investor.

Set up an Arabic media publication focused on Christians in Jordan and Palestine. Milhilard.org

== Awards ==
He has won several international awards, including a 1996 International Press Freedom Award of the US-based Committee to Protect Journalists. The award was given on behalf of his struggles for press freedom in both Israel and the Palestinian Authority.

In 2000, the Austria-based International Press Institute named him one of its fifty World Press Freedom Heroes of the previous fifty years.

Kuttab sits on the board of the International Press Institute, which lists him as the "Director General, Community Media Network" and "Founder, AmmanNet, Jordan."
