= St. Mark's Episcopal Church (Boston, Massachusetts) =

Historic church in Massachusetts, United States

- U.S. National Register of Historic Places
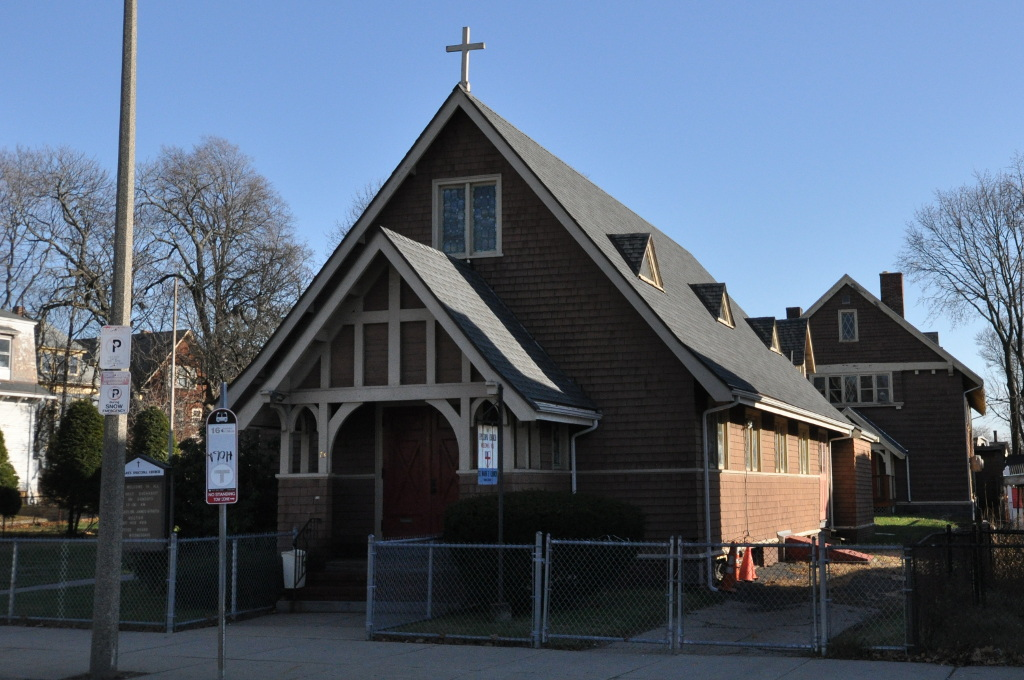

- Location within Massachusetts Location within the United States
- Location: 73 Columbia Rd., Boston, Massachusetts
- Coordinates: 42°18′16″N 71°4′56″W
- Area: less than one acre
- Built: 1904
- Architect: Edmund O. Sylvester
- Architectural style: Craftsman; English Gothic Revival
- NRHP reference No.: 12000783
- Added to NRHP: July 3, 2014

St. Mark's Episcopal Church is a historic church complex at 73 Columbia Road in the Dorchester neighborhood of Boston, Massachusetts. The complex consists of three buildings: a chapel, rectory, and parish hall. All three were built between 1904 and 1909, with the last significant alteration to the exterior of the church occurring in 1916. All three buildings were designed by Edmund O. Sylvester, and present a unified architectural statement of Craftsman styling with some English Gothic (Tudor Revival) detailing. The church complex was listed on the National Register of Historic Places in 2014.

The congregation was established as a mission in 1887 after fire destroyed the St. Mary's Church on Bowdoin Street on June 15, and a portion of its congregation began to meet in the Grove Hall area of Dorchester. St. Mary's Mission carried on until October 31, 1897. An independent mission was organized a week later, which adopted the name "St. Mark's" on March 13, 1898, and which acquired land on Columbia Road to build a church in early October. The cornerstone for the new church was laid April 25, 1904, and the first service held on September 18. The congregation was formally incorporated as a parish on January 15, 1906.

The church reported 95 members in 2017 and 129 members in 2023; no membership statistics were reported in 2024 parochial reports. Plate and pledge income reported for the congregation in 2024 was $86,336 with average Sunday attendance (ASA) of 57 persons.

== Leadership ==
- Henry Martyn Saville - Minister-in-Charge, 1898-1906
- Henry Martyn Saville - Rector, 1906-1907
- Frank Dorr Budlong - Rector, 1907-1918
- Robert Eliot Marshall - Rector, 1930-????
- Burdette Landsdowne - Rector, 1944-????
- R. J. Carlson - Rector, 1957-????
- Thomas W. O. Mayers - Rector, 1991-2008
- Cathy H. George - Priest-in-Charge, 2008-2011
- James K. Githitu - Rector, 2011-2016

== See also ==
- National Register of Historic Places listings in southern Boston, Massachusetts
- Episcopal Church (United States)
