= William Dixon Colley =

Gambian journalist, publisher and editor

William Dixon Colley (var : William Ojo Dixon Colley or William Charles Dixon Colley) was a Gambian journalist, publisher and editor. He was born on 14 November 1913 at Bathurst now Banjul (the capital of the Gambia) and died on 17 January 2001 at Sukuta (a Gambian town). More commonly known as Dixon Colley, he was a co-founder and first Chairman of the Gambia Press Union (GPU) as well as its former Secretary General.

== Life ==
During the Second World War, he went to Europe and after a long stay abroad, including the United Kingdom, decided to return to the Gambia in 1963. That same year, he founded his newspaper Nyaato Africa which was renamed The Nation in 1964. He remained its Managing Editor until the 1990s when the paper was discontinued as a result of old age.

In 1978, Dixon Colley co-founded the Gambia Press Union (GPU) and was made an honorary life member.

He died at the age of 87 following a sudden illness at his home in Sukuta.
