= Providence Island, Liberia =

Island in Liberia

Coordinates: 6.320°N 10.802°W

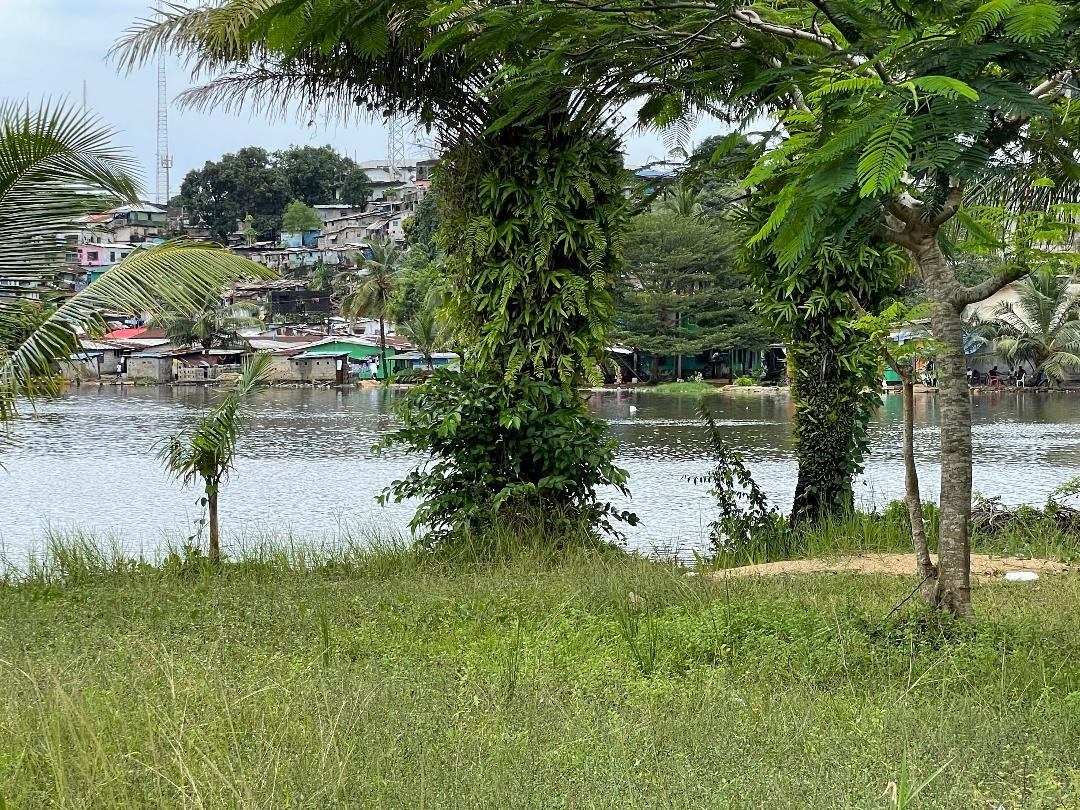
Mesurado River surrounds Providence Island.

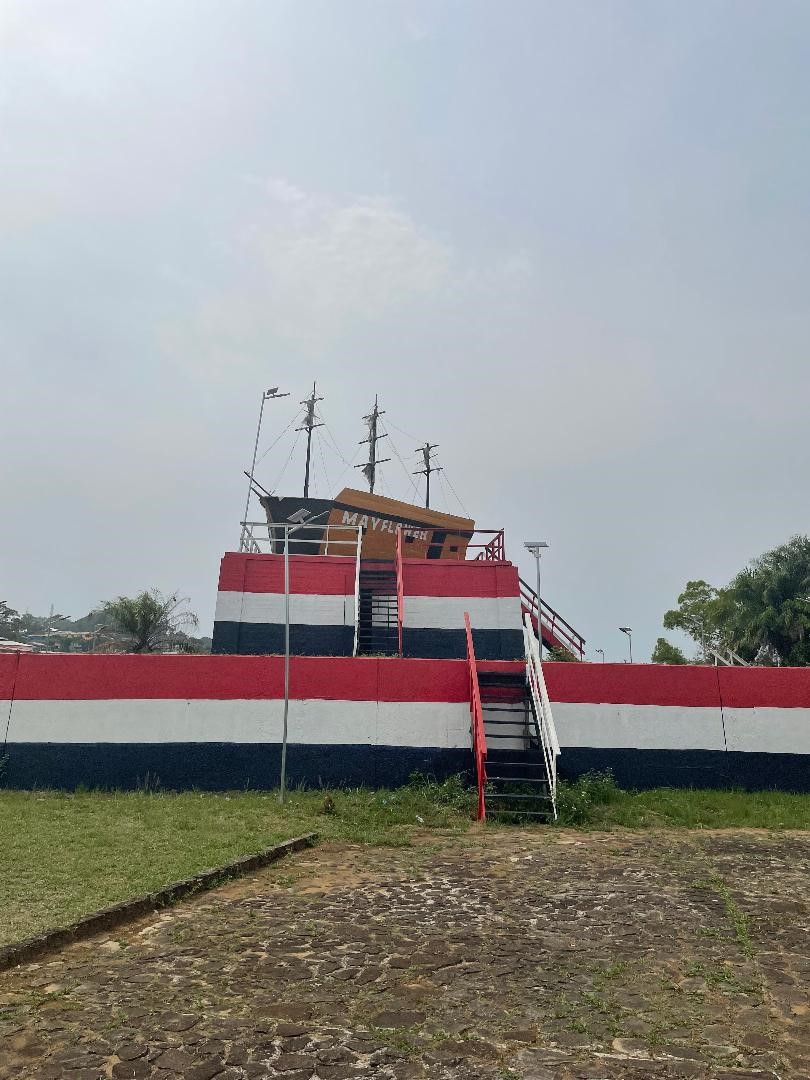
Mayflower monument that once stood on the island.

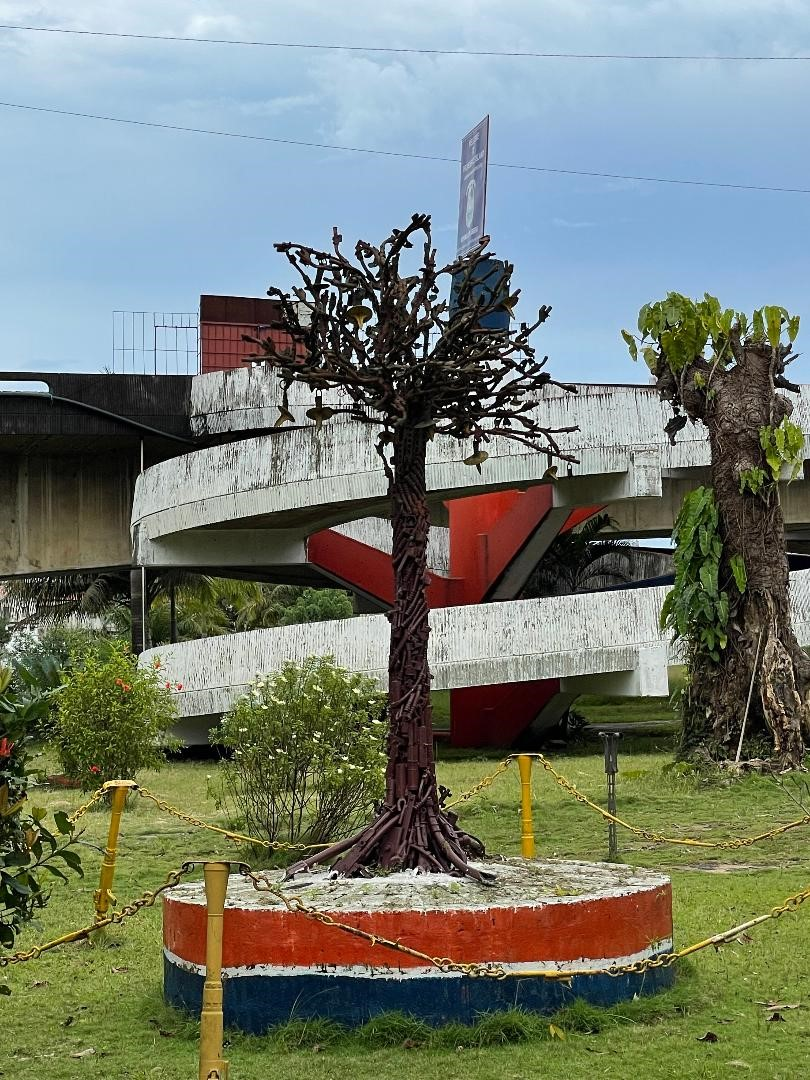
Symbol of conflict resolution on the island.

Providence Island (Historically known as Perseverance, Dozoa Island, or Darzoe Island) was the site of the first successful settlement of American freedmen by the American Colonization Society in Liberia. It has been proposed as a UNESCO World Heritage Site by the government of Liberia.

== History ==
After several unsuccessful attempts at colonization along the Pepper Coast, the American Colonization Society sent two agents, Robert F. Stockton and Eli Ayers, to negotiate with local chieftains to secure a place for colonization. A conference was held at Cape Mesurado, which the locals called Ducor. Reaching an agreement, known as the Ducor Contract, the Society acquired the land bounded on the north and west by the Atlantic Ocean and on the south and east by the Mesurado River, including Cape Mesurado and land on Dozoa Island in the bay. (Note: Monie Captan argues in his work, Introduction to Liberian Government and Political System: A Civics Textbook that there were two islands at the mouth of the Mesurado River. He concludes that Dozoa was not Providence Island, but rather Bushrod Island, because a historical account by Jehudi Ashmun states that the colonists temporarily stayed on an island owned by John S. Mill. Captan states that as Mill owned Providence it could not have been sold to the Society by the chiefs. However, Mill witnessed the Ducor Contract and anthropology professor, Svend Holsoe, reproduced in his article, A Study of Relations between Settlers and Indigenous Peoples in Western Liberia, 1821-1847 an agreement with Mill signed the day after the Ducor Contract to sell them his property.) To ensure the validity of the purchase, (Note: Conflicts later arose, as the chiefs did not understand the concept of ownership or selling land and believed that they had only given the use of the property to the settlers.) Ayers and Stockton ensured that all the surrounding chiefs signed the document. It was executed by Gola chiefs Kaanda Njola of Sao's Town and Long Peter of Klay; Dei chief Kai-Peter of Stockton Creek; Kru chief Bah Gwogro (also George) of Old Kru Town; and chief Jimmy from St. Paul River.

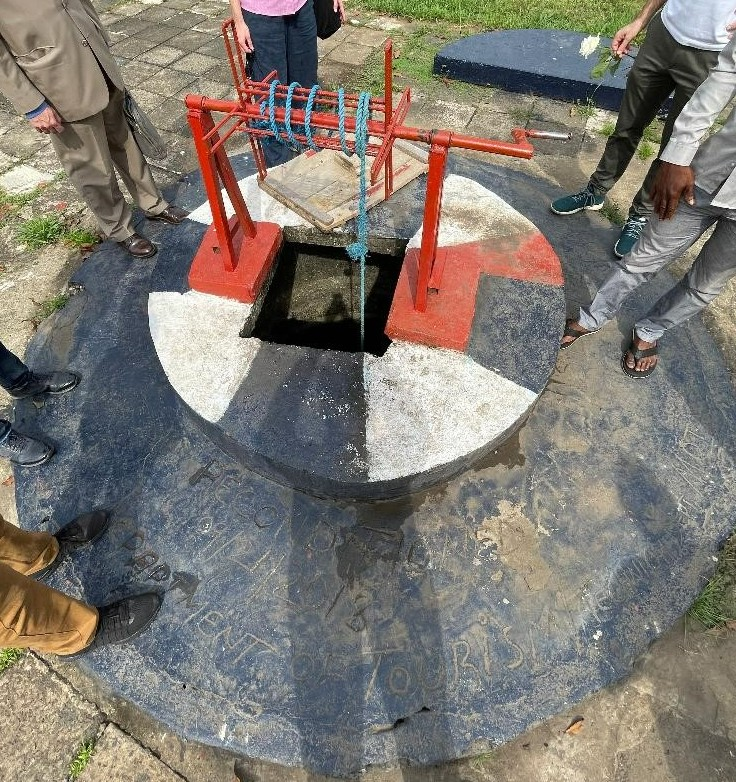
Providence Island ancient well

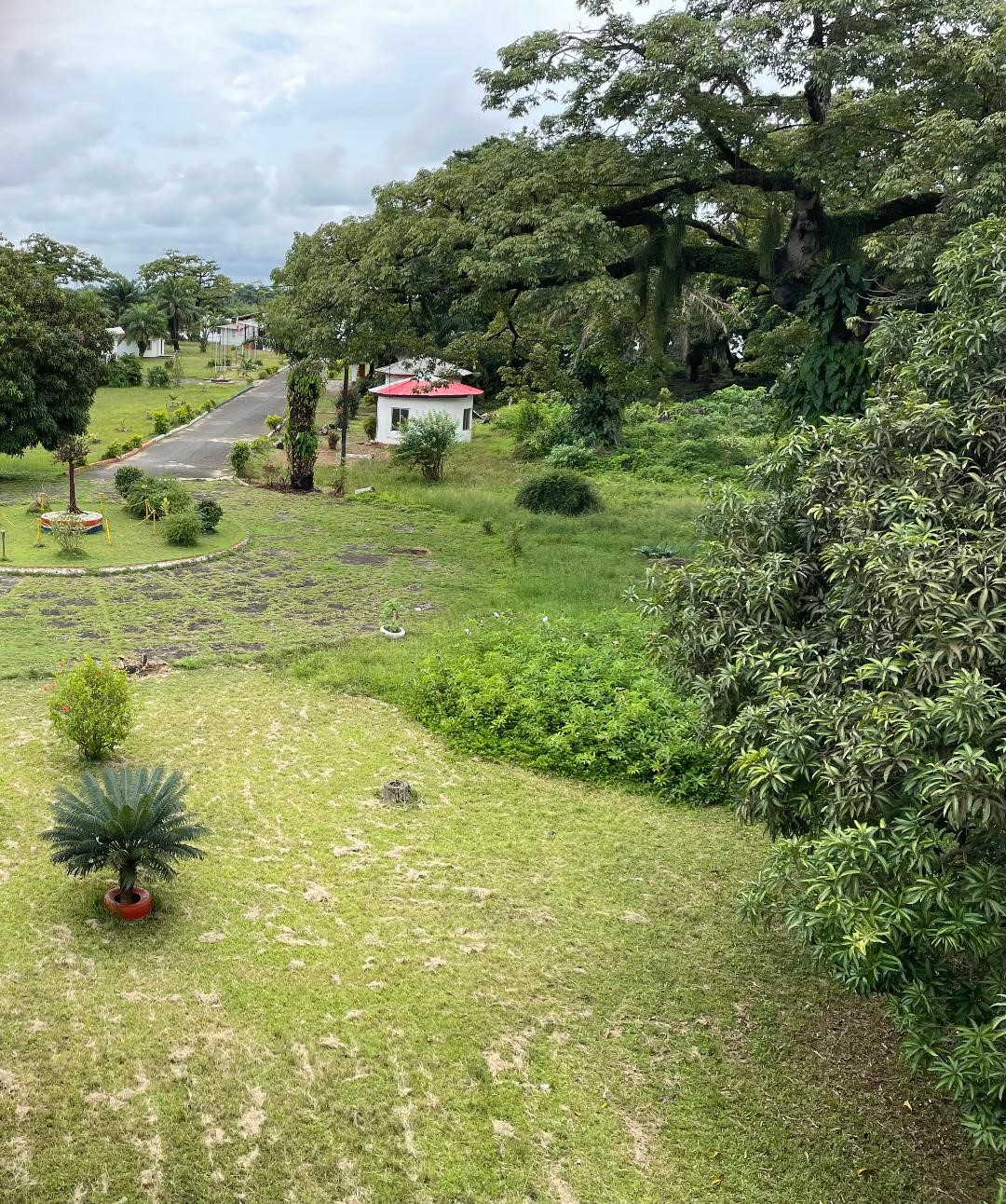
Eastern half of the island with structures replicating those built in the settlers' period.

The colonizers established their first settlement in Liberia on Dozoa Island, which they renamed Perseverance and which was later renamed as Providence. In 2017, the Liberian Ministry of Information, Cultural Affairs and Tourism nominated the island for inclusion as a World Heritage Site.
