= The Daily Observer =

Gambian newspaper

Coordinates: 13.475°N 16.676°W

The Daily Observer is a newspaper published in Bakau in Banjul, the Gambia.

The paper, Gambia's first daily newspaper, was founded by Mae Gene and Kenneth Best in 1990. Kenneth Best had previously managed another paper called the Daily Observer in Liberia, until the First Liberian Civil War caused him to relocate with his family to the Gambia. In October 1994, following Yahya Jammeh's military coup, Best was expelled from Gambia on 30th October 1994, although the newspaper was allowed to continue. Ebrima Ceesay, who was a journalist with the Observer at the time, became the editor of the Daily Observer newspaper after the deportation of Kenneth Best to Liberia. Ebrima Ceesay, who now holds a PhD in Political science, is a Senior Research Fellow at the International Development Department, University of Birmingham, UK. It was eventually shutdown by tax authorities on 23 August 2017 for non-compliance of its tax obligations.

In the early 1990s, the paper ran its History Corner on its weekend supplement (the Weekend Observer). The Gambian statesman and historian Alieu Ebrima Cham Joof "pioneered" this column (the History Corner) in 1993 before asking the paper's resident journalist Hassoum Ceesay to take over the column. Ceesay took over it in 1996. Some of the topics covered during the tenure of Cham Joof included:

- History Corner with Alhaji A. E Cham Joof, Diamond Jubilee of Scouting in The Gambia, Senegambian Scouting Joint Committee Senegalo/Gambian Katibougou old Scouts (Weekend Observer, 29–31 March 1995. p. 9 (Gambia))
- History Corner with Alhaji A. E Cham Joof, The History of the Banjul Mosque, (Weekend Observer, 5–7 May 1995)

== Ebrima Manneh case ==
In July 2006, Observer reporter Ebrima Manneh was reportedly arrested by state security after attempting to republish a BBC report criticizing Jammeh shortly before an African Union meeting in Banjul; his arrest was witnessed by coworkers. Though ordered to release Manneh by an Economic Community Of West African States court, the Gambian government has denied that Manneh is imprisoned. According to AFP, an unnamed police source confirmed Manneh's arrest in April 2009, but added he believed Manneh "is no longer alive." Amnesty International considers Manneh to be a prisoner of conscience and named him a 2011 "priority case." The Committee to Protect Journalists has also called for his release.
