= Crozierville =

Town in Montserrado County, Liberia

- Township
- Location in Liberia
- Coordinates: 6°27′8″N 10°37′51″W
- Country: Liberia
- County: Montserrado County
- District: Careysburg District
- Established: 1865
- Elevation: 91 m (299 ft)
- Time zone: UTC+0 (GMT)

Crozierville is a town in Montserrado County, Liberia, along the Saint Paul River. Crozierville is notable for being one of the few Americo-Liberian settlements founded by immigrants from the Caribbean, instead of the United States.

The town is located 15 miles (24 km) from Monrovia, the capital city of Liberia.

== History ==
Crozierville was settled by immigrants from Barbados. The immigration was the result of a visit by a Liberian delegation to Barbados in the 1860s, where they invited Barbadians and others from the Caribbean to emigrate to Liberia.

In 1864, Joseph S. Attwell, who was born in Barbados, came to the United States to collect funds to assist his compatriots in emigrating to Liberia. He collected about US$20,000, (~$397,089 in 2024) and was instrumental in the founding of the settlement of Crozerville.

On April 6, 1865, the American Colonization Society chartered the ship “Cora”, with 346 Barbadian emigrants for Liberia, where they arrived in Monrovia on May 10, 1865. Many of the emigrants came from the Parish of Christ Church in southern Barbados. Some of the Barbadians later moved from Monrovia to the neighboring country of Sierra Leone, while others founded the Crozerville settlement.

The town was named after John Price Crozer and Samuel A. Crozer, brothers and American Colonization Society benefactors from Philadelphia, Pennsylvania who were influential in organizing the Barbadian emigration project.

Crozerville residents were known as skilled mechanics and farmers (especially in producing arrowroot and ginger), and some residents and their descendants quickly became part of Liberia's Americo-Liberian elite.

The town was the birthplace of Albert Porte, political critic of Barbadian ancestry who was also the editor of the Crozerville Observer. In 1946, Porte became the first Liberian journalist to be imprisoned by President William Tubman.
