= Gambia Press Union =

Gambian journalist trade union

The Gambia Press Union (GPU) is a trade union for journalists in the Gambia. It was established in 1978 by a group of journalists, led by the veteran Gambian journalist and publisher William Dixon Colley (1913-2001). Other co-founders included Deyda Hydara (1946-2004), Melvin B. Jones and Pap Saine.

Around 200 journalists in the field of print and electronic media are registered members of the GPU.

The union’s logo

== List of chairpersons and presidents of the GPU ==
- Melville B. Jones (1978 - 1990) as Chairman
- William Dixon Colley (1978 -1992?) as Secretary General
- Deyda Hydara (1990-1998) as Chairman
- Demba Jawo (1998 -2002) as Chairman
- Demba Jawo (2002-2005) as President
- Madi Ceesay (2005-2008) as President
- Ndey Tapha Sosseh (2008-2011) as President
- Bai Emil Touray (2011 - 2018) as President
- Sheriff Bojang Jnr (2018 - 2021) as President
- Muhammed S Bah (2021 - 2024) as President
- Isatou Keita (2024-2027) as President
