= Kenneth Best =

Liberian journalist

Kenneth Yakpawolo Best (born 28 October 1938) is a Liberian journalist who founded the Liberian newspaper The Daily Observer and a paper of the same name in The Gambia.

He is the nephew of Americo-Liberian journalist of Caribbean descent Albert Porte.

== Biography ==
Best was born in October 1938 in Harrisburg, St. Paul River in Montserrado County, Liberia to Americo-Liberian parents of West Indian descent. He studied at St. Patrick's Elementary School on Snapper Hill, Monrovia. He entered Booker Washington Institute in 1959, graduating with a diploma in agriculture. On 2 December 1963, he graduated with a bachelor's degree in English and political science from Cuttington University (CU) after studying there since 1960. During his years in CU, he ran a literary magazine, the Cuttington Review,. On 3 December 1963, he was appointed Assistant to the Dean of Liberal Arts of the University of Liberia. Between 1963 and 1965, he was a journalist at the Press and Publications Bureau for the Liberian government. In April 1964, he became an information officer for the Department of Information and Cultural Affairs in Tolbert's government. He studied journalism at the Institut für Publizistik in Berlin, West Germany and later at the Graduate School of Journalism at Columbia University, New York, where he received a Master's in Comparative Journalism in 1967.

In 1968, he returned home to Liberia and became the Director of Press and Publications. In 1972, he became Assistant Minister for Information in the Liberian Ministry of Information, Cultural Affairs and Tourism (MICAT). He moved to Kenya in late 1973 and worked as information director of All Africa Conference of Churches (AACC) in Nairobi. He resigned from the AACC in 1980 and returned to Liberia.

In February 1981, Best and his wife founded the Daily Observer, Liberia's first independent daily newspaper. Under the Presidency of Samuel Doe, the Daily Observer was subject to sustained political harassment.

The First Liberian Civil War caused Best to relocate his family by fleeing to The Gambia on 1 August 1990. There he founded Gambia's first daily newspaper on 11 May 1992, again called The Daily Observer. In October 1994, following Yahya Jammeh's military coup, Best was expelled from Gambia, after the newspaper ran a series of stories that were critical of AFPRC on human rights violations, although the newspaper was allowed to continue, it was eventually shutdown by tax authorities on 23 August 2017 for non-compliance of its tax obligations. Best, along with several of his reporters was arrested on 21 October 1994 and detained for 36 hours, before being deported back to Liberia on 30 October 1994.

He and his family moved to the United States and was granted political asylum in January 1995. In 1999, he sold The Daily Observer to businessman Amadou Samba, who was supported by Jammeh. He returned to Liberia in June 2005 and relaunched his old newspaper. He continued to serve as the publisher and editor of the Liberian Daily Observer, which continued to criticize the government. In 2012, Best published The Evolution of Liberia's Democracy: A Brief look at Liberia's Electoral History – 1847-2011.

He married Mae Gene Traub on July 17, 1971. The couple have eight children, including two adopted children.

== Awards ==
Best was named one of International Press Institute's 50 World Press Freedom Heroes in 2000.

== Works ==
- Cultural Policy in Liberia, 1974
- African Challenge, 1975
- "My Fight for Press Freedom", in New African, August 1991.
- The Evolution of Liberia's Democracy: A Brief look at Liberia's Electoral History – 1847-2011, 2012
