= Foroyaa =

Newspaper in Serekunda, The Gambia

Foroyaa is a newspaper located in Serrekunda, the Gambia. It was first launched in July 1987, and is owned by the People's Democratic Organisation for Independence and Socialism (PDOIS), an opposition political party that was instrumental in bringing the downfall of ex-president Yahya Jammeh in the 1 December 2016 election.
