= Lamine =

Lamine, Liamine, or Lyamine is a masculine given name and surname of Arabic origin. It is a local form of the name Al-Amin, a title given to the prophet Muhammad that means "the Trustworthy". Notable people with the name include:

== Given name ==
=== Lamine ===
- Lamine Abid (born 1991), Algerian footballer
- Lamine Ben Aziza (born 1952), Tunisian footballer
- Lamine Ba (footballer, born 1997) (born 1997), French-Mauritanian footballer
- Lamine Bá (footballer, born 1994) (born 1994), Bissau-Guinean footballer
- Lamine Bangura (1964/1965–2024), Sierra Leonean football player and coach
- Lamine Bechichi (1927–2020), Algerian politician
- Lamine Bey (1881–1962), Bey of Tunisia
- Lamine Camara (born 2004), Senegalese footballer
- Lamine Cissé (born 2003), French footballer
- Lamine Moise Cissé (born 1971), Senegalese footballer
- Lamine Conte (born 1998), Guinean footballer
- Lamine Conteh or Lamin Conteh (born 1976), Sierra Leonean footballer
- Lamine Diabira (1959–2010), Malian soldier and coup leader
- Lamine Diaby-Fadiga (born 2001), French footballer
- Lamine Diack (1933–2021), Senegalese businessman, sports administrator, and athlete
- Lamine Diack (footballer) (born 2000), Senegalese footballer
- Lamine Diakhate (1928–1987), Senegalese author, poet, literary critic, politician, and diplomat
- Lamine Diakite (born 1991), Ivorian footballer
- Lamine Diane (born 1997), Senegalese basketball player
- Lamine Diarra (born 1983), Senegalese footballer
- Lamine Diarrassouba (born 1986), Senegalese footballer
- Lamine Diatta (born 1975), Senegalese footballer
- Lamine Diawara (born 1971), Malian basketball player
- Lamine Diawara (footballer) (born 1986), Malian footballer
- Lamine Dieng (1951–2021), Senegalese football manager
- Lamine Djaballah (born 1982), French footballer
- Lamine Fall (born 1992), Senegalese footballer
- Lamine Fanne (born 2004), Spanish footballer
- Lamine Fofana (born 1998), Ivorian footballer
- Lamine Fomba (born 1998), French footballer
- Lamine Gassama (born 1989), Senegalese footballer
- Lamine Ghezali (born 1999), French footballer
- Lamine Gueye (footballer) (born 1998), Senegalese footballer
- Lamine Guèye (skier) (born 1960), Senegalese skier
- Lamine Kamara (born 1940), Guinean writer
- Lamine Kanté (born 1987), French basketball player
- Lamine Kebir (born 1968), Algerian football coach
- Lamine Khene (1930–2020), Algerian politician
- Lamine Koné (born 1989), French-Ivorian footballer
- Lamine Kourouma (born 1987), Ivorian footballer
- Lamine Badian Kouyaté, Malian-Senegalese fashion designer
- Lamine Ly (born 1987), Senegalese footballer
- Lamine Merbah (1946–2026), Algerian filmmaker
- Lamine Mili, American electrical engineer
- Lamine Moro (born 1994), Ghanaian footballer
- Lamine N'dao (born 1993), Ivorian footballer
- Lamine Ndao (born 1994), Senegalese footballer
- Lamine N'Diaye (born 1956), Senegalese football coach and player
- Lamine Ndiaye (French footballer) (born 1995), French footballer
- Lamine Ouahab (born 1984), Moroccan tennis player
- Lamine Ouattara (born 1998), Ivorian-Burkinabé footballer
- Lamine Sadio (born 2007), Senegalese footballer
- Lamine Sagna (born 1969), Senegalese footballer
- Lamine Sakho (born 1977), Senegalese footballer
- Lamine Sambe (born 1989), Senegalese basketball player
- Lamine Sané (born 1987), French-Senegalese footballer
- Lamine Senghor (1889–1927), Senegalese political activist
- Lamine Kaba Sherif (born 1999), Guinean footballer
- Lamine Sidimé (born 1944), Guinean politician
- Lamine Sy (born 2002), French footballer
- Lamine Tamba (born 1985), Senegalese footballer
- Lamine Toure (born 2003), English footballer
- Lamine Traoré (footballer, born 1982) (born 1982), Burkinabe footballer
- Lamine Traoré (footballer, born 1993) (born 1993), Malian footballer
- Lamine Wade (born 1943), Senegalese judoka
- Lamine Yamal (born 2007), Spanish footballer

=== Liamine ===
- Liamine Mokdad (born 2000), French footballer
- Liamine Zéroual (1941–2026), Algerian politician

=== Lyamine ===
- Lyamine Bougherara (born 1971), Algerian football coach and player

== Middle name ==
- Ahmadou Lamine Ndiaye (born 1937), Senegalese veterinarian and academic
- Ali Lamine Zeine (born 1965), Nigerien politician and economist
- Amadou Lamine Ba, Senegalese diplomat
- Amadou Lamine Sall (born 1951), Senegalese poet
- Ludovic Lamine Sané (born 1987), Senegalese footballer
- Mamadou Lamine Loum (born 1952), Senegalese political figure
- Mamadou Lamine Traoré (1947–2007), Malian politician
- Mohamed Lamine Camara (born 1986), Guinean footballer
- Mohamed Lamine Chakhari (born 1957), Tunisian politician
- Mohamed Lamine Dansoko (born 1998), Guinean sprinter
- Mohamed Lamine Debaghine (1917–2003), Algerian politician and independence activist
- Mohamed Lamine Doumouya (born 1995), Ivorian footballer
- Mohamed Lamine Ould Ahmed (born 1947), Sahrawi politician and writer
- Mohamed Lamine Sanha (died 2007), Bissau-Guinean Naval Chief of Staff
- Mohamed Lamine Sylla (1971–2010), Guinean footballer
- Mohamed Lamine Yattara (born 1993), Guinean footballer
- Mohamed Lamine Zemmamouche (born 1985), Algerian footballer
- Muhamed Lamine Jabula Sano (born 1979), Bissau-Guinean footballer
- Ould Lamine Abdallah (1929–2022), French long-distance runner
- Sadio Lamine Sow (born 1952), Malian politician
- Serigne Lamine Diop (1935–2008), Senegalese statistician and politician
- Serigne Mouhamadou Lamine Bara Mbacké (1925–2010), Senegalese Islamic religious leader
- Sidy Lamine Niasse (1950–2018), Senegalese lawyer, teacher, journalist, and religious guide
- Yoro Lamine Ly (born 1988), Senegalese footballer

== Surname ==
- Affoussiata Bamba-Lamine (born 1970), Ivorian politician
- Amadou Lamine-Guèye (1891–1968), Senegalese politician
- Diakite Lamine (born 1983), Senegalese footballer
- Issa Lamine, Nigerien politician
- Mahmadu Lamine (1835–1887), Senegalese marabout and rebel
- Mohammed Lamine (born 2000), Ghanaian footballer
- Moro Lamine (born 1994), Ghanaian footballer
- Nasir Lamine (born 1985), Ghanaian footballer
- Philippe Lamine (born 1976), French athlete

== See also ==
- Lamine Township, Cooper County, Missouri, one of 14 townships in Cooper County, in the U.S. state of Missouri
- Lamine, Wallonia, a district of the municipality of Remicourt, Belgium, in the province of Liège
- Lamine River 63.8-mile-long (102.7 km) tributary of the Missouri River in central Missouri
- Stade Lamine Guèye, multi-use stadium in Kaolack, Senegal
- Lamini, a tribe of camelids including the llamas and relatives, whose members are called lamines
- Lamaline
- Lamin (given name)
- Lamin (surname)
- Lamoine (disambiguation)
- Amin (name)
- Al-Amin (name)

Media related to Lamine (given name) at Wikimedia Commons
