= Al-Amin (name) =

Al-Amin (Arabic: الأمين, romanized: al-Amīn, lit. 'the Trustworthy'), also romanized El-Amin, El-Amine or Al-Ameen and sometimes not hyphenated, is an Arabic masculine given name and surname, originating from a title of Muhammad.

Notable people with the name include:

== Laqab ==
- Al-Amin (787–813), Abbasid caliph

== Given name ==
=== First name ===
- Al-Amin Abu-Manga (born 1951), Sudanese linguist
- Al-Amin Daggash (born 1942), Nigerian military officer
- Al-Amīn al-Hajj Mustafa an-Nakīr, Moroccan chef
- Al-Amin Hossain (born 27 December 1992), Bangladeshi cricketer
- Al-Amin Kazeem (born 2002), English footballer
- Alamin Mohammed Seid (c. 1947–2021), Eritrean politician
- Alamin Usman Alamin, Mufti of Eritrea
- Elamin Abdelmahmoud (born 1988), Canadian writer and political commentator
- El Amin Chentouf (born 1981), Moroccan para-athlete
- El Amin Effendi Hemeida (c. 1900–1973), Sudanese soldier
- Elamine Erbate (born 1981), Moroccan footballer

=== Middle name ===
- Ahmad ibn al-Amin al-Shinqiti (c. 1863–1913), Mauritanian writer
- Mohamed al-Amin Khalifa (1949–2019), Sudanese military officer and politician
- Mohamed Al-Amin Mohamed Al-Hadi (born 1967), Somali politician
- Mohamed El-Amin Ahmed El-Tom (born 1941), Sudanese mathematician and politician
- Mohamed El Amine Amoura (born 2000), Algerian footballer
- Mohamed El Amine Aouad (born 1984), Algerian footballer
- Mohamed el-Amine (Lamine) Bey (1881–1962), Bey of Tunis and King of Tunisia
- Mohamed El Amine Tiouli (born 1987), Algerian footballer
- Mohamed El-Amine Souef (born 1962), Comorian diplomat and politician
- Muhammad al-Amin al-Kanemi (1776–1837), Libyan Islamic scholar, teacher and political leader

== Surname ==
- Abdallah Al Amin (born 1946), Lebanese writer and politician
- 'Abd ar-Rahman ibn Muhammad al-Amin (died 1854), Shehu of Bornu
- Azim Al-Amin (born 2001), Malaysian footballer
- Ishmael El-Amin (born 1998), American basketball player
- Jamil Abdullah Al-Amin (born 1943), American Muslim cleric
- Khaled El Amin (born 1976), known as Khaled Bebo, Egyptian footballer
- Khalid El-Amin (born 1979), American basketball player
- Mohammad Al-Amin (born 1993), known as Al-Amin, Bangladeshi cricketer
- Mohamad Alamin (born 1972), Malaysian lawyer and politician
- Mohammed al Amin (1943–2023), Sudanese musician
- Mohammed Al-Amin (born 2004), Bangladeshi footballer
- Muhammad El-Amin (born 1987), American basketball player
- Mohsen al-Amin (1867–1952), Lebanese Islamic scholar and biographer
- Nafisah Ahmad al-Amin, Sudanese politician and women's rights activist
- Talibdin El-Amin, American politician
- Theresa El-Amin, American civil rights activist, union organizer and politician
- Yaphett El-Amin (born 1971), American politician
- Younes Elamine, Moroccan-French musician, poet and entrepreneur

== See also ==
- Al-Ameen (disambiguation)
- Alamin (disambiguation)
- Amin (name)
- Lamin (given name)
- Lamin (surname)
- Lamine
