= List of people associated with Middlesex University =

This is a list of Middlesex University people, including notable alumni and staff associated with the university.

== Alumni ==
=== Artists and sculptors ===
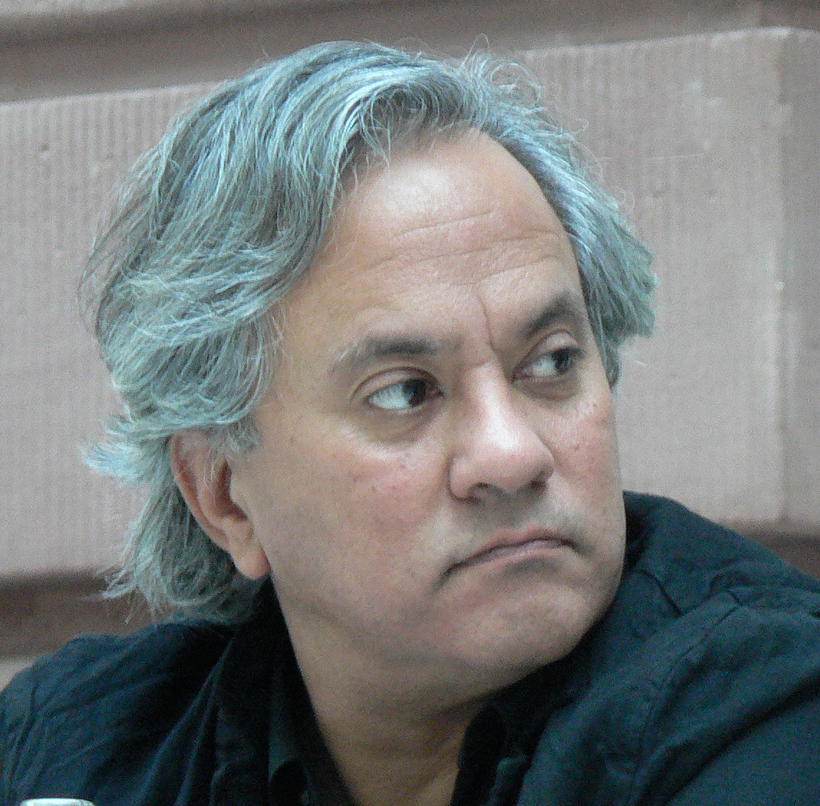
Anish Kapoor

- Neville Brody, graphic designer, typographer and art director
- Chinwe Chukwuogo-Roy, Nigerian-born visual artist
- Gillian Condy, South African botanical artist
- Sheila Giolitti, American painter
- Allen Jones, sculptor
- Sir Anish Kapoor, sculptor
- Keith Khan, artist, co-founder of Motiroti
- Langlands and Bell, artists
- Conrad Leach, artist and custom motorcycle designer
- John Lundberg, artist and filmmaker
- Stephen D. Nash, wildlife artist
- Michael Petry, American multi-media artist; co-director of the Museum of Installation in London
- Jane Ray, illustrator of children's books
- Deganit Stern Schocken, Israeli jewelry artist
- Lola Young, artist, teacher and Crossbench peer
- David Wightman, painter

=== Fashion and film industry ===
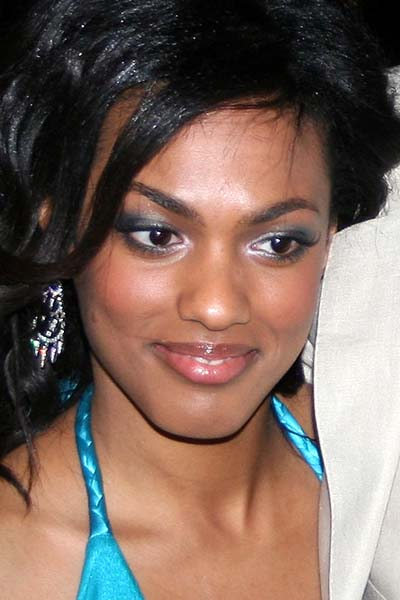
Freema Agyeman

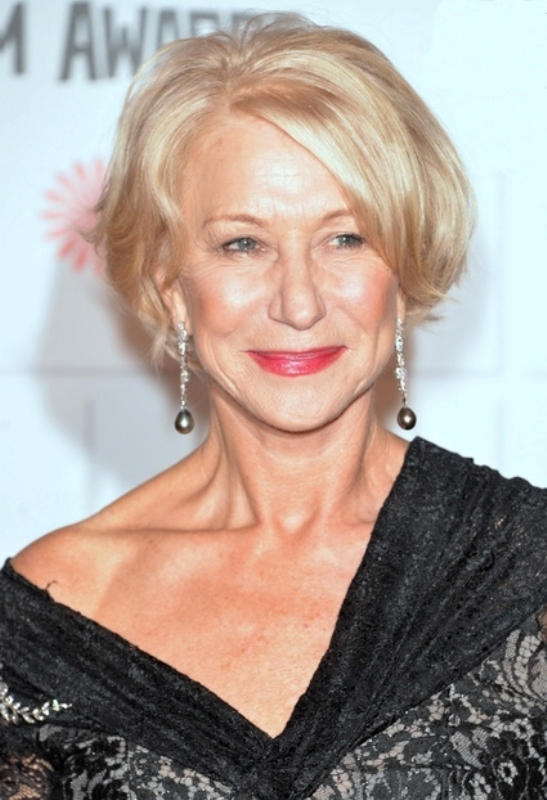
Helen Mirren

- Freema Agyeman, actress (Martha Jones in Doctor Who)
- Charlotte Bellamy, actress
- BodyMap, designers Mike Holah and Stevie Stewart
- Adam Brown, actor, comedian, and pantomime
- Danyul Brown, celebrity stylist
- Mike Figgis, film director, writer and composer
- Ashley Isham, fashion designer
- Malcolm Kohll, South African script writer and producer
- Matthew Marsden, actor
- Oliver Mason, actor
- Petra Massey, actress
- Helen Mirren, actress, star of Calendar Girls and The Queen
- Roxy Murray, stylist, podcaster and disability rights advocate
- Mark Nash, Film Historian
- Peter Polycarpou, actor
- Venkat Prabhu, Indian film director
- Martine Rose, British-Jamaican fashion designer
- Kevin Sacre, actor; plays Jake Dean in Hollyoaks
- Dan Skinner, actor and comedy writer
- Rob Spendlove, actor
- Arulnithi Tamilarasu, Indian actor
- Dickon Tolson, actor
- Arabella Weir, comedian, actress and writer

=== Sports ===
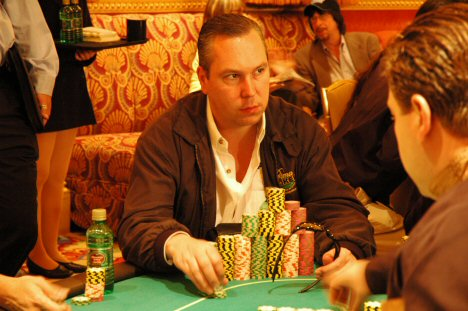
Joe Beevers

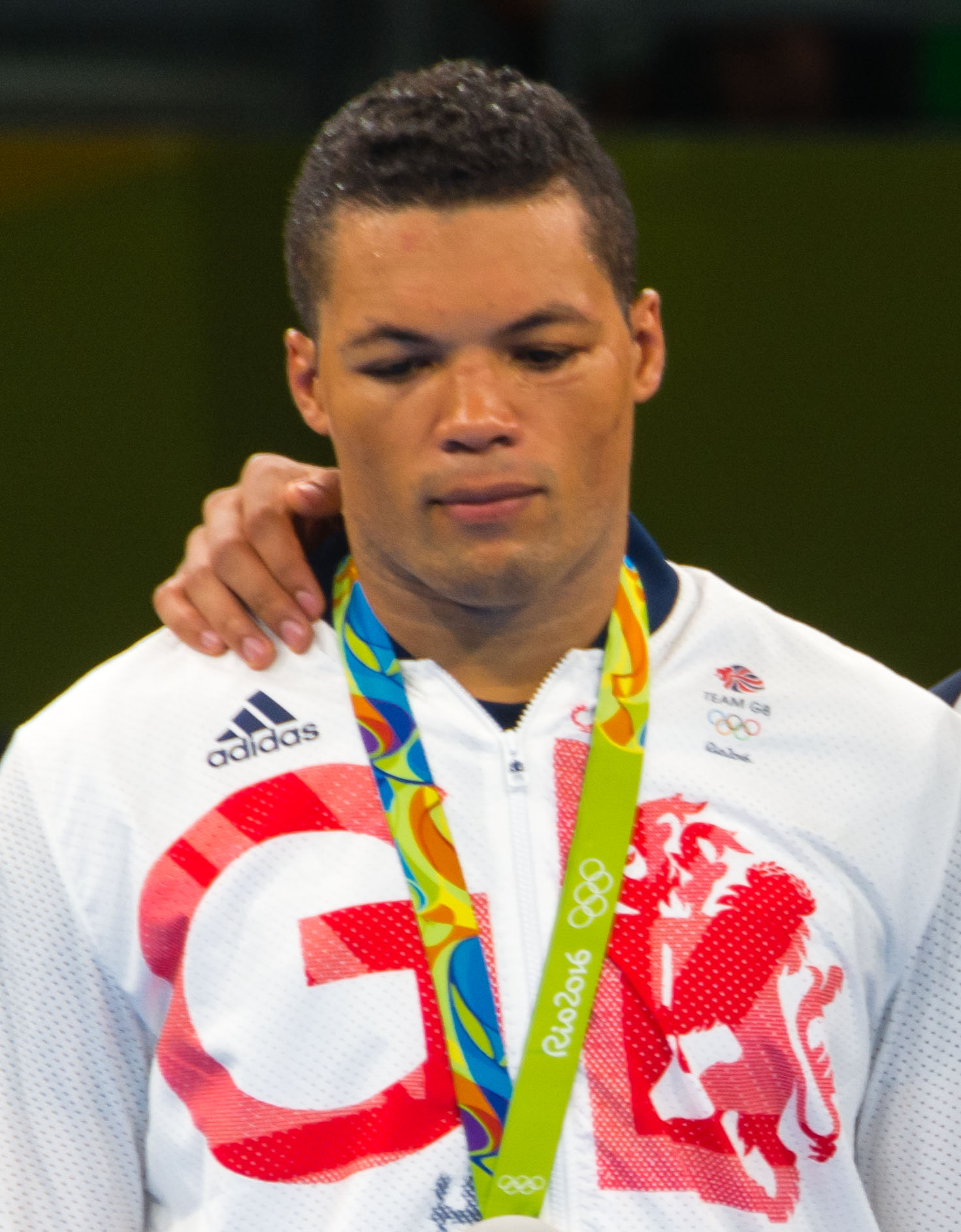
Joe Joyce
- Joe Beevers, professional poker player
- Montell Douglas, sprinter
- Joe Joyce, professional boxer
- Simeon Williamson, sprinter
- Zooey Perry, handball player

=== Literature, journalism and mass media ===
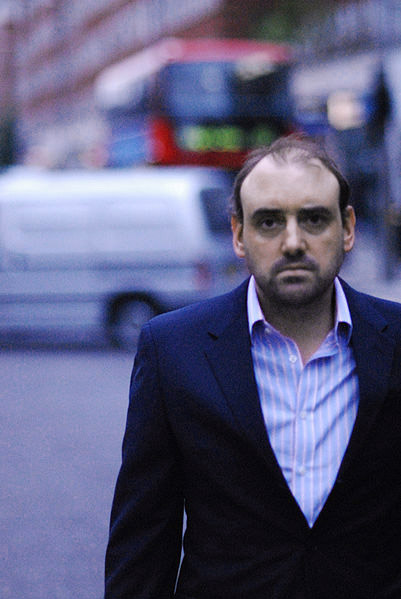
Henry Bond

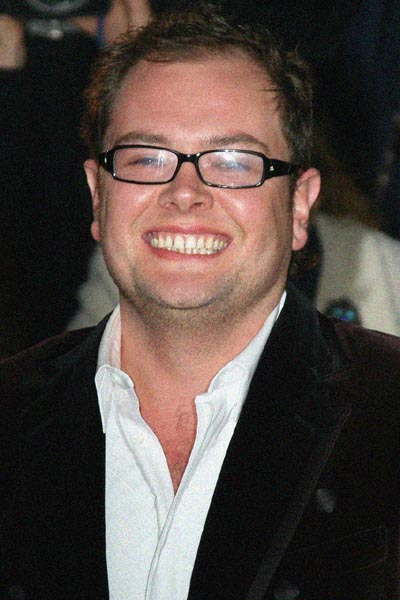
Alan Carr

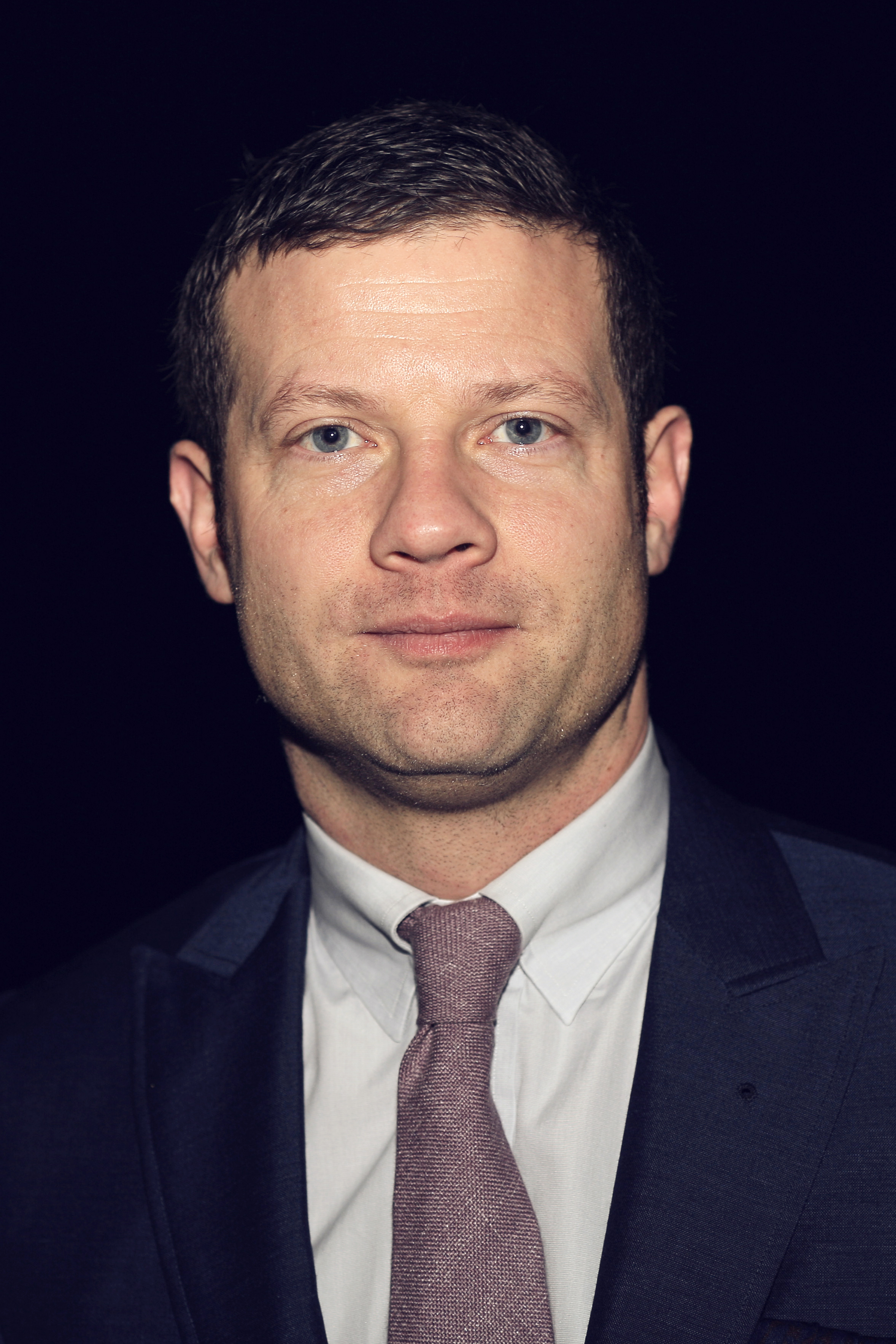
Dermot O'Leary
- Monica Ali, writer, author of Brick Lane
- Ben Barkow, writer
- Nicholas Blincoe, novelist and screenwriter
- Henry Bond, writer and photographer
- Martin Booth, novelist
- Neil Daniels, freelance writer
- John Diamond, broadcaster and journalist
- Richard Dinnick, screenwriter and author
- Ruth England, television presenter and actress
- James Heartfield, writer
- David Hepworth, journalist, broadcaster and magazine publisher
- James Herbert, novelist
- Laura Hird, novelist
- Stephen Jordan, writer and director
- Louise Lear, BBC weather presenter
- Suzanne Moore, journalist
- Dermot O'Leary, television presenter
- Tony Richards, dark fantasy or horror author
- Peace Hyde, West African correspondent for Forbes Africa

=== Music, radio and entertainment ===
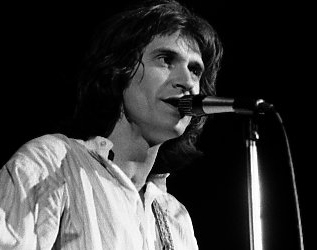
Ray Davies

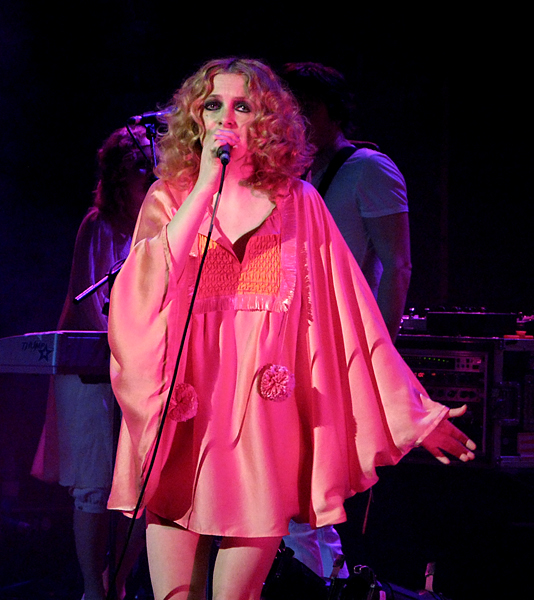
Alison Goldfrapp

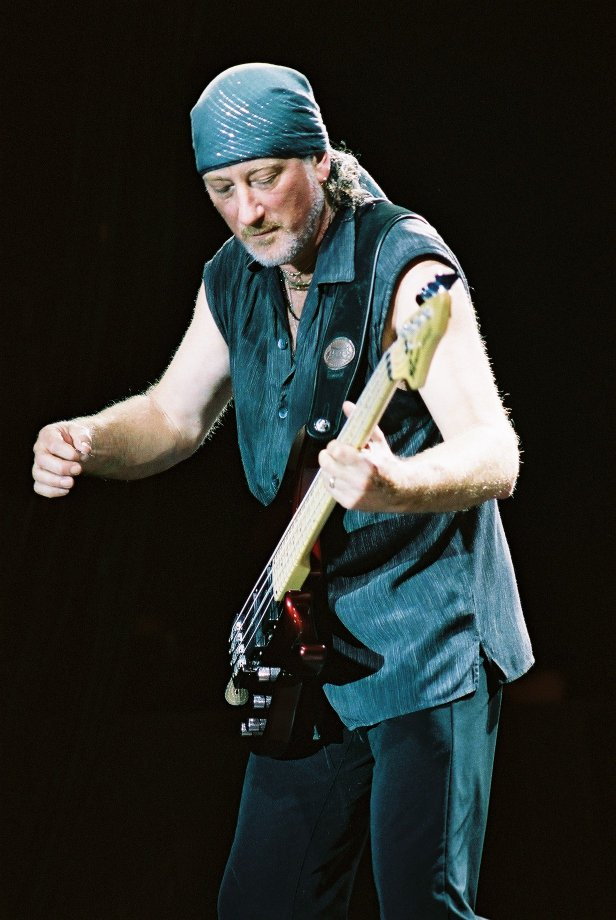
Roger Glover

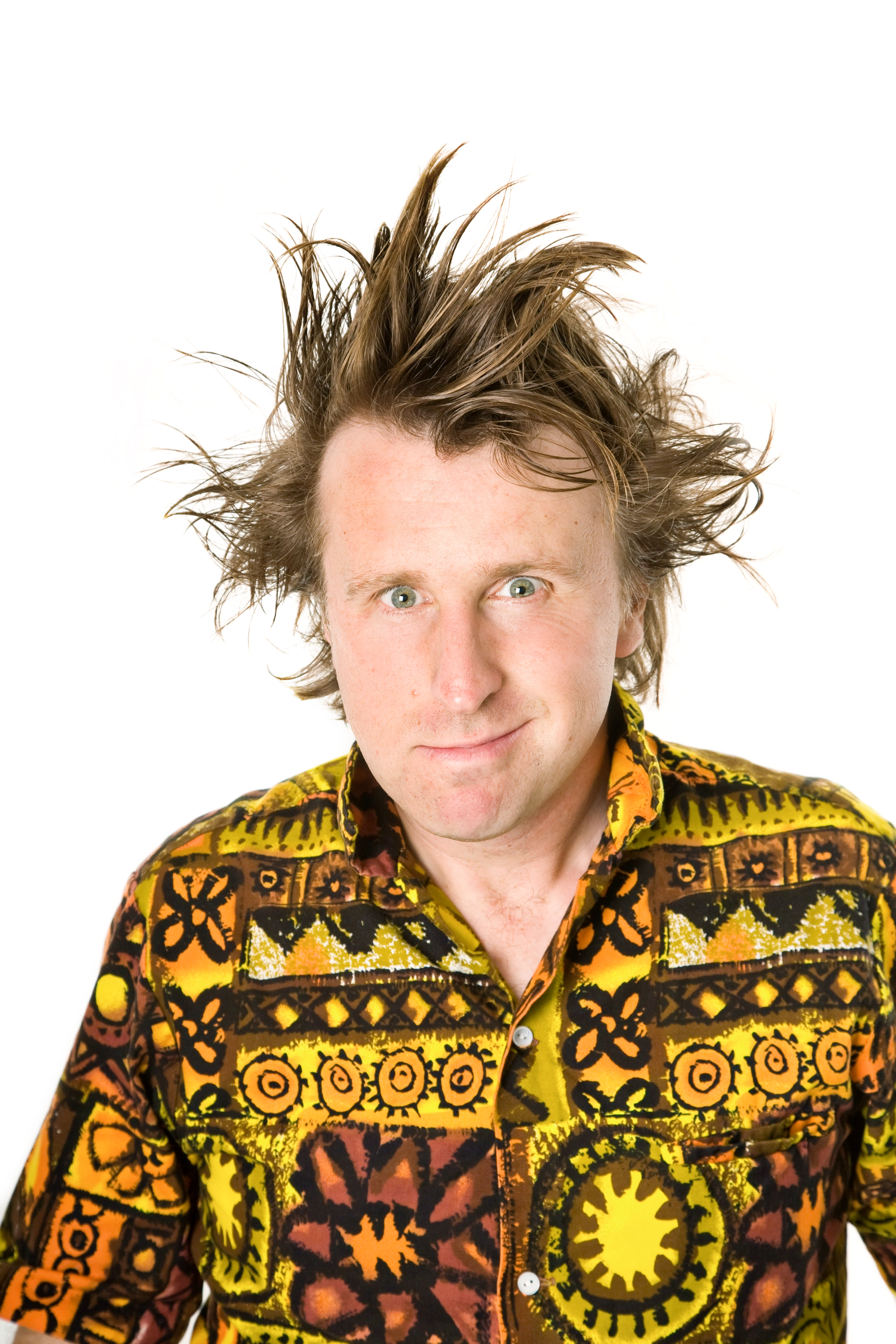
Milton Jones
- Adam Ant (real name: Stuart Goddard), musician
- Kuljit Bhamra, composer, record producer, musician
- Bibio (real name: Stephen Wilkinson), music producer
- Alan Carr, comedian
- Paul Carr, guitarist, former member of the James Taylor Quartet
- Jon "JS" Clayden and Mark Clayden, musicians (Pitchshifter)
- Ray Davies, CBE, musician (The Kinks)
- Marina Diamandis, singer-songwriter
- Jo Enright, comedian
- Adam Ficek, drummer for Babyshambles
- Bryn Fowler, bassist in The Holloways
- Roger Glover, musician (Deep Purple)
- Alison Goldfrapp, musician (Goldfrapp)
- Neil Grainger, actor and comedian
- Jake Hook, songwriter, music producer and singer
- Milton Jones, comedian
- Russell Kane, writer and comedian
- Kevin Kerrigan, music producer, composer
- Led Bib, jazz band
- Iain Lee, radio presenter
- Naser Mestarihi, hard rock musician
- Deborah Mollison, composer and songwriter
- Ruth Ojadi, singer
- Vic Reeves, comedian
- John Rocca, dance music performer, remixer, percussionist, and record producer, most well known for his band Freeez.
- Dave Sturt, bass player and producer
- Ian Willcock, composer and academic
- Johnny Vegas, comedian
- Joanne Yeoh, Malaysian violinist

=== Politics and public service ===
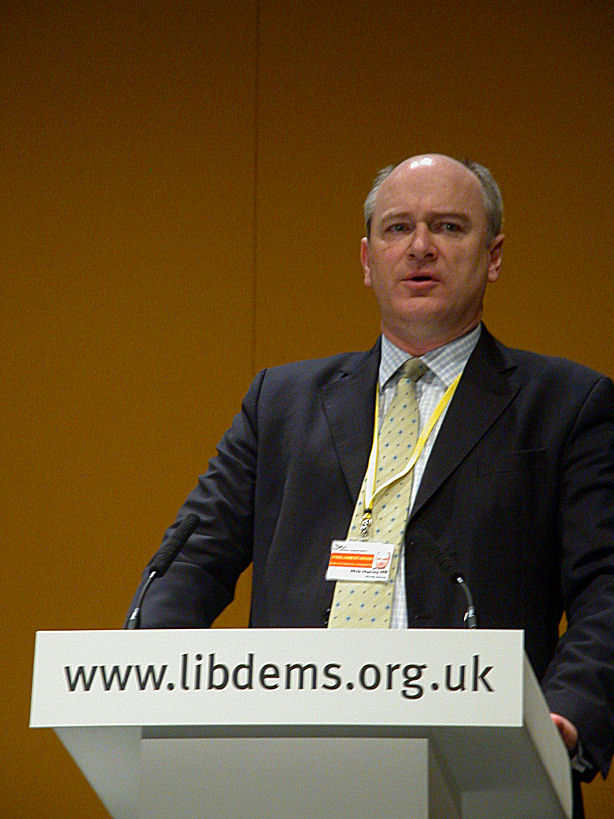
Nick Harvey

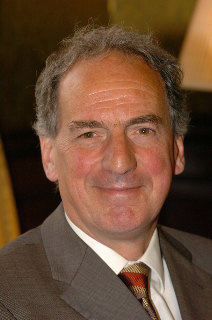
Kim Howells

- Kwame Addo-Kufuor, Ghanaian politician and physician
- Ahmed Shakeel Shabbir Ahmed, Kenyan politician
- Gladys Asmah, Minister for Fisheries, Ghana
- Gareth Bennett, UKIP Member of the National Assembly for Wales
- Christine Butler, MP (Labour)
- Mike Gapes, MP (Labour)
- Mohamed Al-Amin Mohamed Al-Hadi, Somali politician
- Abdi Yusuf Hassan, Somali politician and diplomat
- Nick Harvey, MP, Liberal Democrats
- Kim Howells, MP (Labour)
- Ray Lewis, Guyana-born youth worker, former Deputy Mayor of London
- Michael Lyons, former Labour Party councillor and the Chairman of the BBC Trust
- Clifford Sibusiso Mamba, Swazi diplomat; former Olympic athlete
- Tom Nairn, theorist on nationalism, political activist
- Steve Sinnott, general secretary, National Union of Teachers
- Tan Tee Beng, Malaysian politician
- Özlem Türköne, Turkish columnist and politician
- Fayyaz Ismail, Maldivian politician and former Minister of Economic Development

=== Other ===
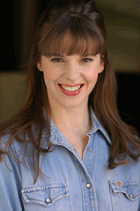
Victoria Stilwell

- Ralph Alabi, Nigerian engineer, industrialist
- Yannis Behrakis, Greek photojournalist
- Charlie Camlin, American Anglican bishop
- Timothy Campbell, winner of The Apprentice
- Lady Sarah Chatto, daughter of Princess Margaret
- Slash Coleman, American storyteller, producer, and writer
- William Gibson, historian, academic, and professor
- Mavin Khoo, Malaysian dancer
- Nick Leeson, former rogue derivatives trader
- Bello Bala Shagari, Nigerian activist
- Mazhar Majeed, sporting agent
- Suzannah Olivier, nutritionist
- John Rowan, counsellor, psychotherapist, clinical supervisor
- Sue Sanders, LGBT rights activist
- Stephen Sizer, Anglican priest
- Dave Snowden, Welsh lecturer, consultant, researcher
- Victoria Stillwell, TV presenter; dog trainer
- Blay Whitby, philosopher and technology ethicist
- Myo Myint Kyaw, technopreneur

== Academics ==
=== Faculty of Arts and Creative Industries ===
- David Rain (creative writing)
- Chris Batchelor (jazz)
- Sonia Boyce (fine art)
- Richard Billingham (photography)
- James Martin Charlton (creative writing)
- Katy Deepwell (art theory and criticism)
- Peter Fribbins (music)
- Nikki Iles (jazz)
- Keith Piper (fine art)

=== Faculty of Professional and Social Sciences ===
- David Conway (Professor Emeritus of Philosophy)
- Stephan Dahl (marketing)
- Ed Gallagher (environmental studies)
- John Grahl (European integration)
- Ivor Grattan-Guinness (Professor Emeritus of the History of Mathematics and Logic)
- Bernard Ingham (marketing)
- John Lea (criminology – left realism; law and order)
- Irena Papadopoulos (transcultural nursing research)
- John Redwood (management)
- Ivan Roitt (Director, Centre for Investigative & Diagnostic Oncology)
- Vincenzo Ruggiero (sociology – organised and corporate crime)
- Doirean Wilson (equality diversity & inclusion and cross-cultural studies)
- Lola Young (Professor Emeritus of Cultural Studies)
- Jock Young (criminologist/sociologist, critical criminology)

=== Faculty of Science and Technology ===
- Meir Manny Lehman (computing science)
- David Turner (computing science)
