= Lamin (disambiguation) =

Lamin is a type of structural protein in the cell nucleus.

Lamin may also refer to:

- Lamin (given name)
- Lamin (surname)
- Lamin (rapper) (born 1995), Danish rapper and songwriter
- Lamin, North Bank Division, Gambia
- Lamin, Western Division, Gambia
- Lamin House, in Indonesia
