= Al-Ameen =

Al-Ameen or Al Ameen may refer to:

== Buildings ==
=== Schools and colleges ===
- Al-Ameen College, Langford, Western Australia
- Al-Ameen College, Edathala, Kerala, India
- Al-Ameen Educational Society, Bangalore, Karnataka, India
- Al-Ameen Memorial Minority College, Baruipur, West Bengal, India
- Al-Ameen Mission, Khalatpur, West Bengal, India
- Al Ameen School, Dubai, UAE
- Milli Al-Ameen College for Girls, Kolkata, West Bengal, India

=== Religious buildings ===
- Mohammed Al Ameen Mosque, Bawshar, Oman

== People ==
- Al-Amin (name), people with the given name or last name

== Other uses ==
- Al Ameen (newspaper), Indian Malayalam-language newspaper
