= Lamin, Gambia =

Lamin is a name used by two cities in the Gambia:

- Lamin, North Bank Division, Gambia, a town located in the North Bank Division
- Lamin, Western Division, Gambia, a city located in the Western Division near the national capital Banjul
