= Lavoine (disambiguation) =

Lavoine is a commune in the Allier department in central France.

Lavoine may also refer to:

- Gilbert Lavoine (1921–1965), French boxer
- Marc Lavoine (born 1962), French singer and actor
- Sarah Lavoine, French designer and interior designer

== See also ==
- Lamoine (disambiguation)
- Lavoie, a surname
