= Battle of El Alamein =

There were two Battles of El Alamein in World War II, both fought in 1942. The battles occurred during the North African campaign in Egypt, in and around an area named after a railway stop called El Alamein.

- First Battle of El Alamein: 1–27 July 1942. The advance of Axis troops on Alexandria was blunted by the Allies, stopping the Italian and German forces that were trying to outflank the Allies' position
- Second Battle of El Alamein: 23 October – 4 November 1942. This was an Allied victory that broke the Axis line, forced them all the way back to Tunisia, and led Winston Churchill to remark in 10 November 1942, at the Lord Mayor's Luncheon, Mansion House, London, that "It may almost be said, 'Before Alamein we never had a victory. After Alamein we never had a defeat.'"

In addition, the Battle of Alam el Halfa (30 August – 5 September 1942) was fought during the same period and in the same location.

== See also ==
- Battle of Alamín, during the Reconquista
- El Alamein (disambiguation)
