= Mumtaz Khan =

Mumtaz Khan may refer to:

- Mumtaz Ahmed Khan (humanitarian) (1935–2021), Indian founder of the Al-Ameen Educational Society
- Mumtaz Ahmed Khan (Jammu and Kashmir politician), Indian politician from Jammu and Kashmir
- Mumtaz Ahmed Khan (Telangana politician) (born 1949), Indian politician from Telangana
- Mumtaz Hussain Khan (born 1973), Pakistani politician
- Mumtaz Khan (field hockey) (born 2003), Indian field hockey player
