= Bohbot =

Bohbot can refer to:

- Bohbot Entertainment, American entertainment company

- Bohbot Kids Network, syndicated children's TV programming block distributed by Bohbot Entertainment

- Bohbot (surname), surname of Judeo-Moroccan origin
