= Bohbot (surname) =

Bohbot is a surname of Judeo-Moroccan origin. Notable people with the surname include:

- Elkana Bohbot (born 1989), Israeli hostage
- Franck Bohbot (born 1980), French photographer
- Hervé Bohbot, French Scrabble player
- Shlomo Bohbot (born 1942), Israeli politician
