= Al-Ameen Educational Society =

Education institution for Muslims in Bangalore

- Established: 1966
- Founder: Mumtaz Ahmed Khan
- Type: Educational
- Location: Bangalore, Karnataka India

Al-Ameen Educational Society was started in the year 1966 to meet the needs of education in the city of Bangalore and of the minority Muslim community. Mumtaz Ahmed Khan is the founder of al-Ameen Educational Society. Number of social workers supported him to start and establish around 20 branches of Al-Ameen Educational Society and 200 institutions throughout India.

== History ==
Mumtaz Ahmed Khan is the founder of Al-Ameen Educational Society. At the age of 31, in 1966 Khan founded the Al-Ameen Movement. Abbasiya Begum, a member of the Karnataka Legislative Council, was elected the first chairperson.

== Structure ==
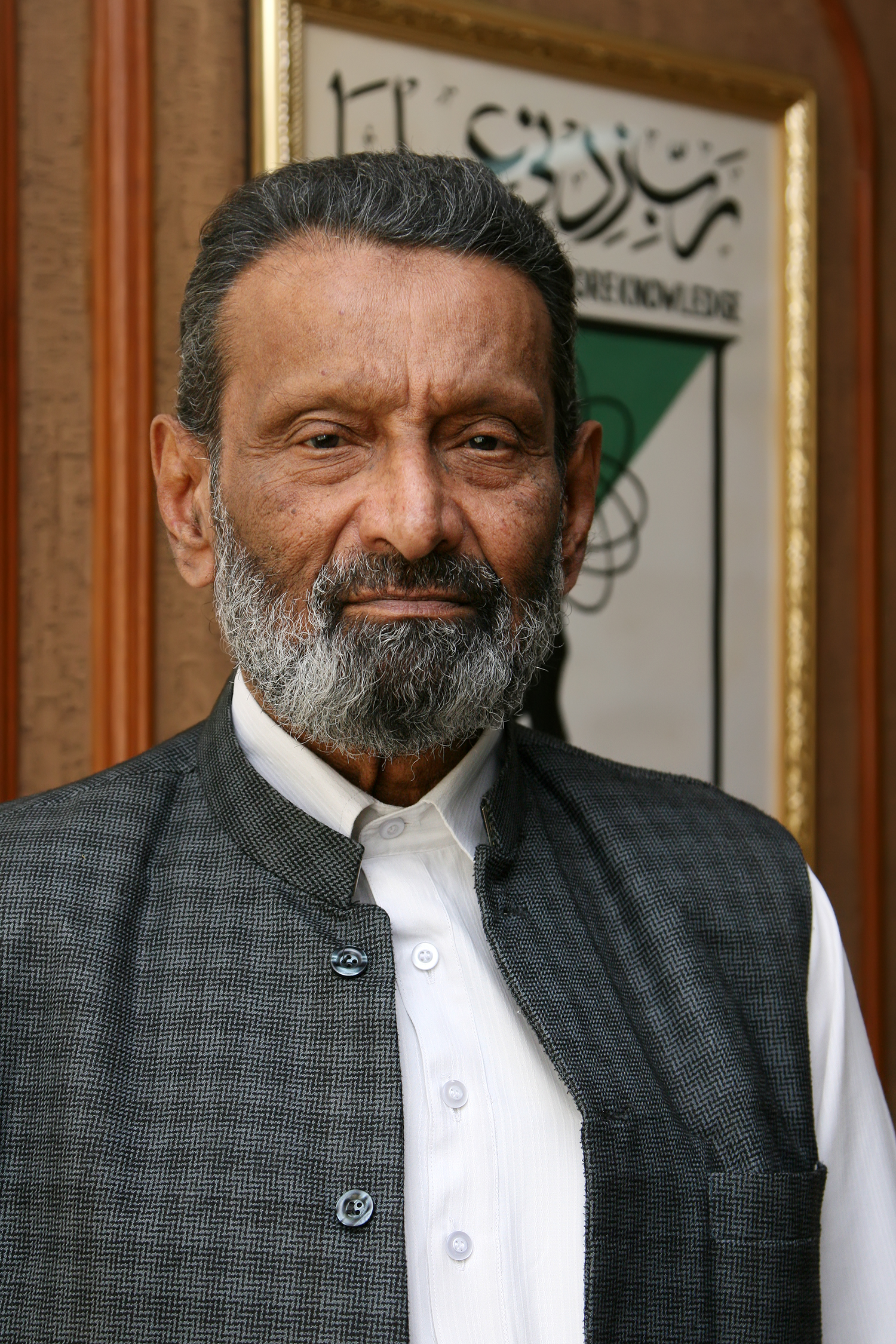
Founder Mumtaz Ahmed Khan

Designation	Details
Founder & Chairman	Mumtaz Ahmed Khan
Vice Chairman Ahmed Sharif siraj
Vice Chairman	Ziauddin
Hon. Secretary	Zubair Anwar
Joint Secretary	Afzal ibrahim khan
Treasurer Dr Maqsood Ali Khan

== Activities ==
Planning Commission of India member Syeda Saiyidain Hameed was awarded Al-Ameen All India Community Leadership Award – 2006 by the secretary, chairman and vice chairman on 23 January 2007.

== Institutions ==
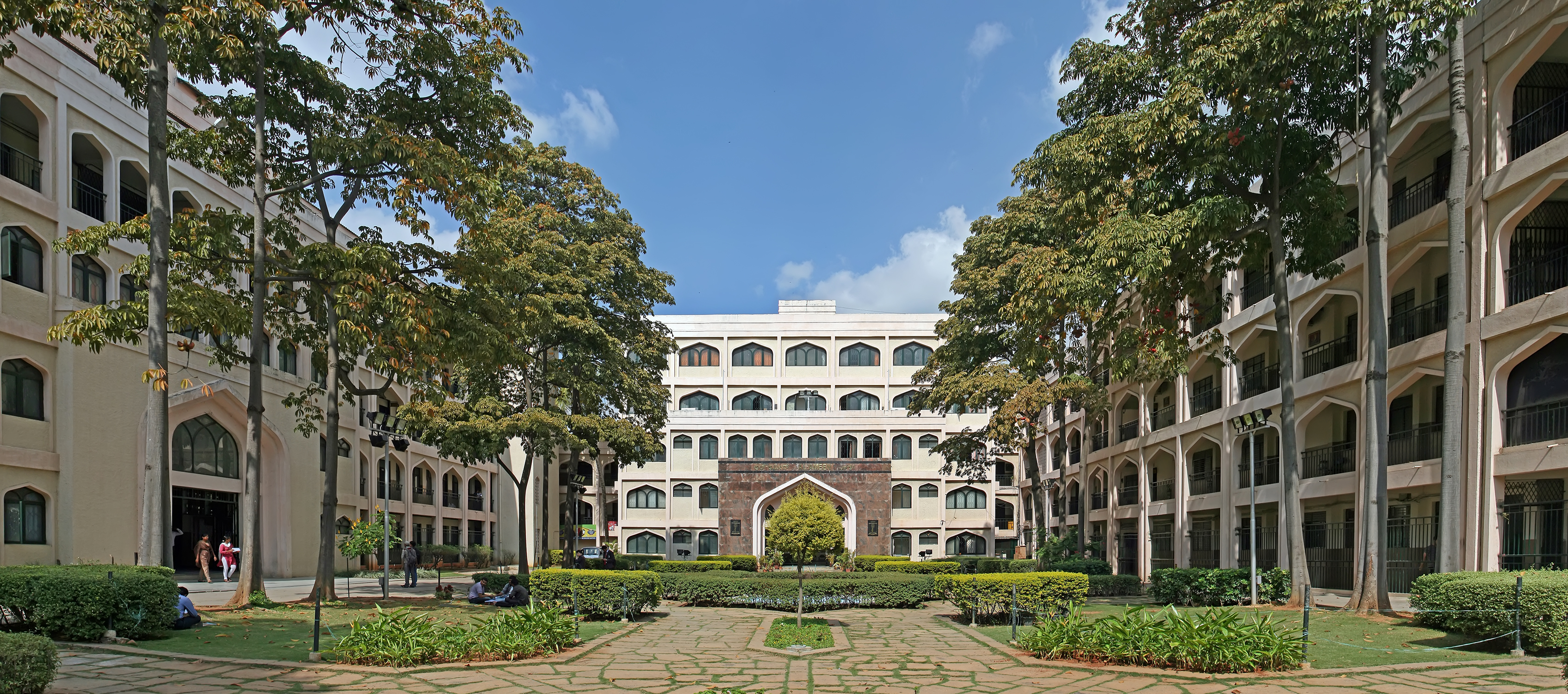
Al-Ameen College of Pharmacy, part of the Al-Ameen Educational Society

- Al-Ameen College of Pharmacy
- Al-Ameen College of Law
- Al-Ameen Arts, Science and Commerce Degree College
- Al-Ameen College of Education
- Al-Ameen Institute of Management Studies
- Al-Ameen Institute of Information Sciences
- Al-Ameen Pre University College
- Al-Ameen Primary & High School
- Al-Ameen Medical college Hospital
