= List of muftis of Eritrea =

This is a list of Muftis of Eritrea:

- Ibrahim Mukhtar
- Alamin Usman Alamin
