= Alamein =

Alamein may refer to:

- El Alamein, a town in Egypt
  - First Battle of El Alamein, during World War II
  - Second Battle of El Alamein, during World War II
- Alamein railway line, Melbourne, Australia
  - Alamein railway station on the line
- HMS Alamein (D17), a Royal Navy destroyer

== See also ==
- Enham Alamein, a village in Hampshire in England
- Alamin (disambiguation)
- El Alamein (disambiguation)
