= Alamin =

Alamin may refer to:

== Religion ==
- Al-ʿĀlamīn (Arabic: العالمين), the concept of universe in Islam
  - included in the phrase al-ḥamdu l-illāhi rabbi l-ʿālamīn ("all praise is due to God, Lord of all the worlds")
  - included in Sayyidat Nisa' al-Alamin ("mistress of the women of the worlds"), a title of Fatima, daughter of Muhammad

== People ==
- Al-Amin (name), people with the given name or last name Al-Amin (or variants)

== Other ==
- Battle of Alamín, during the Reconquista
- Ating Alamin, a Filipino television program

== See also ==
- Alamein (disambiguation)
- El Alamein (disambiguation)
