= Hope Whitehead =

American politician (born 1959)

Member of the Missouri House of Representatives from the 57th district
- In office 2010–2011
- Preceded by: Talibdin El-Amin
- Succeeded by: Karla May

Personal details
- Born: January 30, 1959 (age 67)
- Party: Democratic

Hope Elizabeth Whitehead (born January 30, 1959) is an American politician. She was member of the Missouri House of Representatives for the 57th district.

In 2020, Whitehead became the first African-American to hold the position of Judicial Administer. She works at St. Louis County Circuit Court.

On November 10, 2026, the Judges of the St. Louis County Circuit Court voted to oust Whitehead from her position of Judicial Administrator.
