= Luchaa Mohamed Lamin =

Sahrawi politician and diplomat (1952-2013)

Luchaa Mohamed-Lamin Meilad Suilem
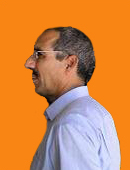

Sahrawi Ambassador to Angola
- In office 3 July 2008 – 16 March 2013
- Prime Minister: Abdelkader Taleb Omar
- Preceded by: Ahmed Salama Sid-Ahmed
- In office April 1977 – March 1981
- Prime Minister: Mohamed Lamine Ould Ahmed

Polisario Front Representative to Sweden
- In office May 1991 – September 1993
- Prime Minister: Mahfoud Ali Beiba

Sahrawi Ambassador to Yugoslavia
- In office February 1987 – June 1989
- Prime Minister: Mohamed Lamine Ould Ahmed; Mahfoud Ali Beiba

Polisario Front Representative to Spain
- In office March 1981 – September 1982
- Prime Minister: Mohamed Lamine Ould Ahmed

Personal details
- Born: December 17, 1952 Smara, Spanish Sahara, Spanish West Africa
- Died: March 16, 2013 (aged 60) Hospital Universitario de Gran Canaria Doctor Negrín, Las Palmas de Gran Canaria, Spain
- Cause of death: Lung cancer
- Party: POLISARIO
- Spouse: Ebhaiya
- Children: Jatri, Abba, Jalil, Embarka and Nadhira

Luchaa Mohamed-Lamin (17 December 1952 – 16 March 2013), also known as Obeid Luchaa, was a Sahrawi politician, diplomat and co-founder of the Polisario Front, a national liberation movement that seeks self-determination for Western Sahara. One of his daughters is Nadhira Mohamed, who was the protagonist of the Spanish film Wilaya.

== Career ==
Luchaa Mohamed-Lamin was born in Smara, Spanish Sahara. He did his primary and secondary studies in Smara and in El Aaiun beginning in 1967. As a youngster, he got involved in the Movement for the Liberation of Saguia el Hamra and Wadi el Dhahab (in Arabic, Harakat Tahrir) led by Muhammad Bassiri. In May 1972, he organized with El-Ouali Mustapha Sayed and Mahfoud Ali Beiba the first Sahrawi demonstrations in Tan-Tan, being later one of the participants on the Polisario Front founding congress in Zouerate, on 10 May 1973.

From July 1973 to November 1974, he was part of POLISARIO's Information Committee, in charge of the Spanish version of the magazine "May 20". In August 1974, he was elected to the Political Bureau at the II Congress of the organization. From December 1974 to his decease, he was part of the POLISARIO's Foreign Relations Committee.

In 1975, he was jailed by Idi Amin in Kampala with Mohamed Lamine Ould Ahmed and Habib Boukhreis, when they tried to represent the Polisario Front at an Organisation of African Unity Foreign Affairs ministers summit at the Ugandan capital.

In April 1977, he was appointed as the first Sahrawi Arab Democratic Republic (SADR) ambassador to Angola, also Polisario Front Representative for Southern Africa. In March 1981, he moved to Madrid as POLISARIO Representative to Spain. He returned to the Sahrawi refugee camps in November 1982, staying there until February 1986. In February 1987, he was appointed as SADR ambassador to the Socialist Federal Republic of Yugoslavia, staying in that post until June 1989. Between May 1991 to September 1993, he was the POLISARIO Representative for the Nordic countries, with a base in Stockholm. From November 1994 to December 1999 he was an observer during the MINURSO identification process for the self-determination referendum, and from September 2001 to December 2006, Polisario Front Delegate for the Canary Islands. On 3 July 2008, he was appointed again as SADR ambassador to Angola. On 4 July 2009 he presented his letter of credentials as non-resident ambassador to Namibia.

== Death ==
Luchaa Mohamed-Lamin died of lung cancer in the Hospital Universitario de Gran Canaria Doctor Negrín in Las Palmas de Gran Canaria, Canary Islands, Spain, in which he had been hospitalized for months. He was buried in the cemetery of the Wilaya of Smara, Sahrawi refugee camps on March 24.

== Quotes ==
Some selected quotes:

- "The Polisario Front has to go hand in hand with the Sahrawi people and not vice versa"
- "If we want to speak about realism, lets make ourselves a question, what is more realistic to accept the fait accompli of an illegal occupation or to defend the dictates of international law?"
- "Solidarity as an ideological movement, is not exporting systems, but to let the people decide their fate"
