= Lamin (surname) =

Lamin is a surname. Notable people include:

- Adam Ben Lamin (b. 2001), Swedish-born Tunisian footballer
- Luchaa Mohamed Lamin (1952–2013), Sahrawi politician
- Mike Lamin, Sierra Leonean politician
- Nadhira Luchaa Mohamed-Lamin (b. 1989), Sahrawi actress

== See also ==
- Lamin (given name)
