= Franck Bohbot =

French photographer

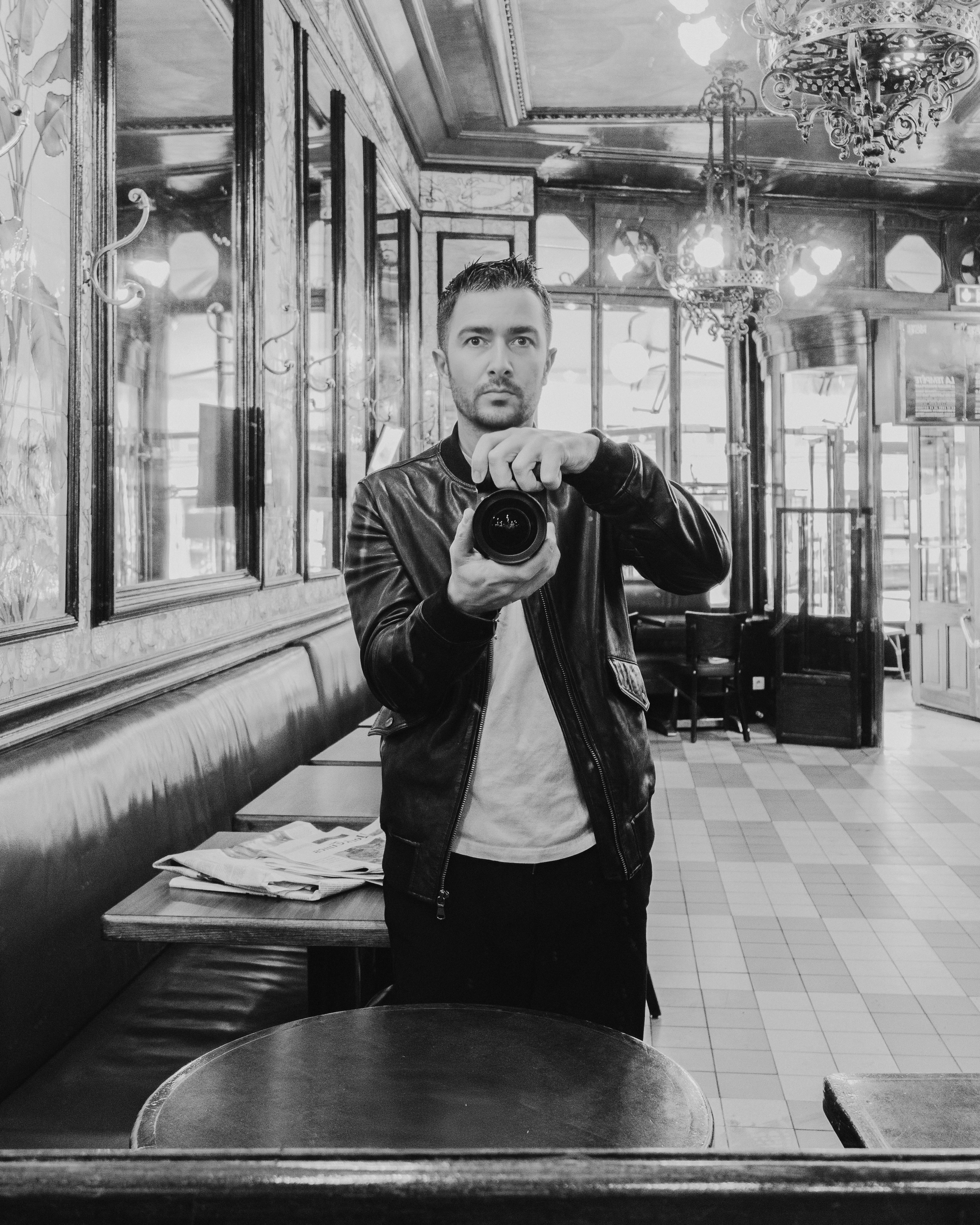
- Born: 12 November 1980 (age 45)
- Known for: Photography
- Notable work: The New York Times: Swimming Pool Series; Light On Series
- Awards: International Photo Awards, Archifoto Prize International Awards of architectural photography, PX3 Paris Photography Prize
- Website: www.franckbohbot.com

Franck Bohbot (born November 12, 1980) is an artist, photographer, and director who began his career in 2008 and takes pictures of spaces, streets, and portraits.

His works have appeared in newspapers and magazines and he has collaborated with fashion, advertising, and design brands.

He has published two books, Light On New York City and Back to the Arcade.

== Biography ==
Bohbot was born in a suburb of Paris in 1980 and moved to New York City in 2013.

== Style ==
National Geographic described Bohbot as "a master of interior and exterior spaces".

Wired wrote on Franck Bohbot's Chinatown Series "The series draws directly from the visual vocabulary and tonal palette of cinema. Many of the pictures bring to mind the unmistakable look of Blade Runner. The heavy atmosphere in these photos seems loaded with a sense of drama, like a portal into some modern noir film".

ArchDaily wrote "Bohbot embraces quasiperfect symmetry, creating a surreal quality and invoking a sense of curiosity with each image".

== Works ==
Bohbot's work has appeared in The New York Times, New York Magazine, Wired, National Geographic, The New York Times Magazine, Vogue Magazine, and L'Obs. Bohbot was commissioned by the Louvre Museum to make photographs of their gallery interiors in 2013.

In 2014, his first series of Portraits, Cuts, was premiered and published in The New York Times,

In 2014, his series, Chinatown, was published in Wired,

In 2015, Bohbot collaborated with British fashion designer Paul Smith.

In June 2015, Bohbot was commissioned by The New York Times Magazine, to photograph the DreamHack in Jönköping, Sweden. His featured images included large-scale color photographs, monumental views, and portraits of gamers.

In 2016, Bohbot released his monograph entitled Light On New York City, published by teNeues.

June 2018, his Portrait Series and book project in collaboration with writer Philippe Ungar, We Are New York Indie Booksellers, is premiered and published in The Guardian.

May 2019, his Series Forever Young, is published in The Guardian.

November 2019, his work LA Confidential, is published in The Guardian, and said: “At night, everything changes, and the neon lights help to create the scene… this could be the LA from the past but also from the future.”

In February 2021, Designboom, published his work on Richard Neutra.

In June 2021, his documentary project The Last Show, that showcased Southern California Theatres during the lockdown is published in El País.

In January 2022, his timeless portraits of L.A's Arcades were published in The New York Times,.. He quotes: "My fascination is partly a result of seeing these places portrayed in popular films, from “Jaws” and “Terminator 2” to “Back to the Future Part II” and “Ferris Bueller’s Day Off.” But arcades also remind me of my own childhood experiences — particularly during my teenage years, when, alone or with my friends, I’d hunt down a Street Fighter or Pac-Man arcade, or lose myself on a home console: Atari, Nintendo, Sega."

In February 2024, Franck Bohbot collaborated with the French famous interior designer Sarah Lavoine. The series, mounted on acrylic-framed prints, captures the Saint-Germain-des-Prés neighborhood from day to night, showcasing Bohbot’s distinctive photographic style.

Franck Bohbot lives and works in Los Angeles with his wife Katia and their two daughters Clara and Chloé .

== Books ==
=== Publications ===
- Back to the Arcade (Setanta, 2023). ISBN 978-1-915652-04-1.
- Light on New York City (teNeues, 2016). ISBN 978-3-8327-3443-5.
