= Younes Elamine =

Musical artist

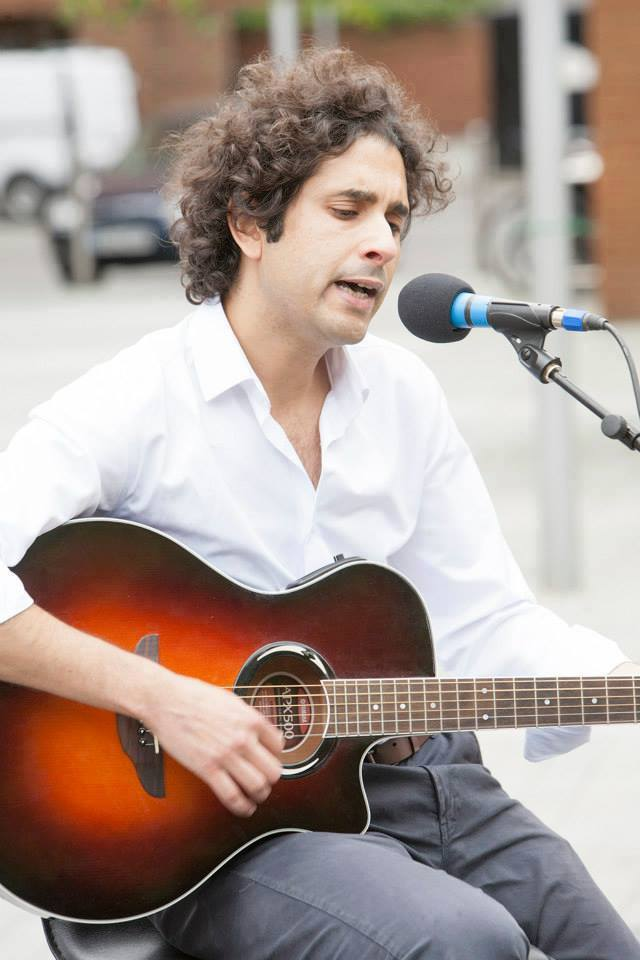
- Elamine at Shubbak festival 2015

Background information
- Born: Agadir, Morocco
- Genres: Folk; French chanson; Arabic
- Occupations: Singer-songwriter, guitarist, producer, engineer
- Instruments: Guitar, harmonica
- Years active: 2009–present
- Label: Independent
- Website: youneselamine.com

Younes Elamine (Arabic: يونس الأمين) is a Moroccan–French singer-songwriter, poet, music producer, engineer and entrepreneur born in Agadir, where he grew up until the age of 17, before moving to Casablanca, then France in 2001 – he studied and worked in Belfort, Marseille, Toulon, Nice and Paris. Since 2014, he lives between London, Agadir and Paris.

In 2009, he produced his first EP called "Nouveau Décor". In 2013, Elamine released an album named Episodes, including a cover version of "Masters of War" by Bob Dylan., and in July 2018, a single in Arabic named "Mandhar Ghrib".

Since 2009, he performed many concerts in France, Morocco and the United Kingdom. In 2011, he participated in the 10th festival "Quand l'Afrique nous tient" held in Paris, in 2015, in Shubbak festival (dedicated to contemporary Arab culture) in London, and in 2018, at Talguitart festival in Agadir.

== Life and career ==
=== Origins ===
Younes Elamine was born and raised in Agadir. His father is from Youssoufia, and mother from Agadir. They lived and worked in Morocco and partially in France for a few years before Younes's birth and during his young age.

=== Education ===
Elamine got his high school diploma in mathematics at "lycée Youssef Ben Tachefine" in Agadir, then moved to Casablanca for two years to study mathematics at CPGE Galilée.

In 2001, he moved to Belfort for a year to study mechanics, then to Marseille where he got a bachelor's degree in mathematics and computer science, then a D.U. in Economics from Aix-Marseille University. His next move was to Toulon where he did a Master in business engineering at ESCT Toulon.

=== Musical beginnings ===
While studying in Marseille Younes discovered a profound connection with music. He developed it during this period and continued while working as a business engineer in Nice. After two years, he decided to quit his job to focus on music and start an entrepreneurial journey.

== Albums, EPs and Singles ==
=== Nouveau Décor (EP) ===
Nouveau Décor is a 5 titles EP released on the 1st of December 2009. It was recorded and mixed in Nice during the same year.

==== Track listing ====
No.	Title	Writer(s)	Length
1.	"Nouveau décor"	Younes Elamine	4:58
2.	"Sur la route du désert"	Younes Elamine	3:41
3.	"Nssal"	Younes Elamine	3:54
4.	"Au bord du temps"	Younes Elamine	6:13
5.	"Ce soleil n'est pas pour toi"	Younes Elamine	4:54
Total length:			23mn

=== Episodes (Album) ===
Episodes is a 10 titles album released on March 21, 2013. It includes nine original songs and one cover version of Masters of War written by Bob Dylan. It has five songs in French, four in Arabic and one in English.

The album was recorded in Nice and Paris, and was produced by Younes Elamine. The mixing and mastering were done in Paris.

==== Track listing ====
No.	Title	Writer(s)	Length
1.	"Sur la route du désert"	Younes Elamine	4:58
2.	"Nouveau décor"	Younes Elamine	3:41
3.	"Fi droub ennass"	Younes Elamine	4:00
4.	"Or-men's dream"	Younes Elamine	3:52
5.	"J'ai perdu du temps"	Younes Elamine	3:21
6.	"Nssal"	Younes Elamine	3:54
7.	"Au bord du temps"	Younes Elamine	6:13
8.	"Ce soleil n'est pas pour toi"	Younes Elamine	4:54
9.	"Mouhal nessmeh"	Younes Elamine	4:23
10.	"Masters of War"	Bob Dylan	4:38
Total length:			43:59

=== Mandhar Ghrib (Single) ===
Mandhar Ghrib (Strange Sight) is a Single in Arabic. It was released on July 7, 2018. It was recorded in London and mastered at Metropolis Studios by Tim Young (Grammy Award winner in 2008 for the album Love by the Beatles).

==== Track listing ====
No.	Title	Writer(s)	Length
1.	"Mandhar Ghrib"	Younes Elamine	03:40
Total length:			03:40
