= Lamoine =

Lamoine is the name of the following places in the United States:

- Lamoine, Maine, a town
- Lamoine, Washington, an unincorporated community
- Lamoine Hotel, a historic hotel in Macomb, Illinois
- LaMoine River, a tributary of the Illinois River
- Lamoine Township, McDonough County, Illinois

== See also ==
- Lemoine (disambiguation)
