= El Alamein (disambiguation) =

El Alamein is a city in the northern Matrouh Governorate of Egypt.

El Alamein may also refer to:

- New Alamein, a city in northern Matrouh Governorate of Egypt.
- First Battle of El Alamein, (July 1942)
- Second Battle of El Alamein, (October – November 1942)
- El Alamein (1953 film), an American war film
- El Alamein: The Line of Fire, a 2002 Italian war-drama film
- El Alamein: Battles in North Africa, 1942, a 1973 board wargame about the World War II North African campaign

== See also ==
- Alamein (disambiguation)
- Alamin (disambiguation)
