= Myo Myint Kyaw =

Burmese technology specialist and entrepreneur

- မျိုးမြင့်ကျော်
- Born: 1985 (age 40–41); Yangon, Myanmar
- Education: Middlesex University
- Occupation: Technopreneur

Myo Myint Kyaw (Burmese: မျိုးမြင့်ကျော်: born 1985) is a Burmese technopreneur, software engineer, founder and former CEO of Revo Tech, one of Myanmar's largest tech companies. He has been one of the pioneers in Myanmar's tech industry. Myo Myint Kyaw is currently a director of the Earth Group of Companies, a major industrial conglomerate, and the managing director of a subsidiary, Earth Renewable Energy.

== Career ==
Myo Myint Kyaw sold crisps and coke in high school; rented out his PlayStation to friends for an hourly rate; and went on to hawk games on eBay when he moved to London where he studied business information systems at Middlesex University, and worked as a part-time barista at Starbucks to help pay his tuition. After nine years in London, he relocated to Singapore, where he worked as a software engineer at ExxonMobil for three years. He returned to Myanmar in 2012 and established Revo Tech, a software and web design company. He began to receive calls from large corporations, followed by Anthem Asia. Two years after starting Revo Tech, Myo Myint Kyaw transformed it into one of Myanmar's largest digital firms. He represents an emerging community of young tech enthusiasts in Myanmar, and his narrative serves as a reflection of the obstacles encountered by startups in the country, several of which are specific to the country.

In 2016, he founded the Akhayar Media, a local digital media outlet. He sold all of his Revo Tech and Akhayar Media shares at the end of 2018, and Earth Group Companies offered him a director post in 2019.
