= Lamoine Hotel =

- U.S. National Register of Historic Places
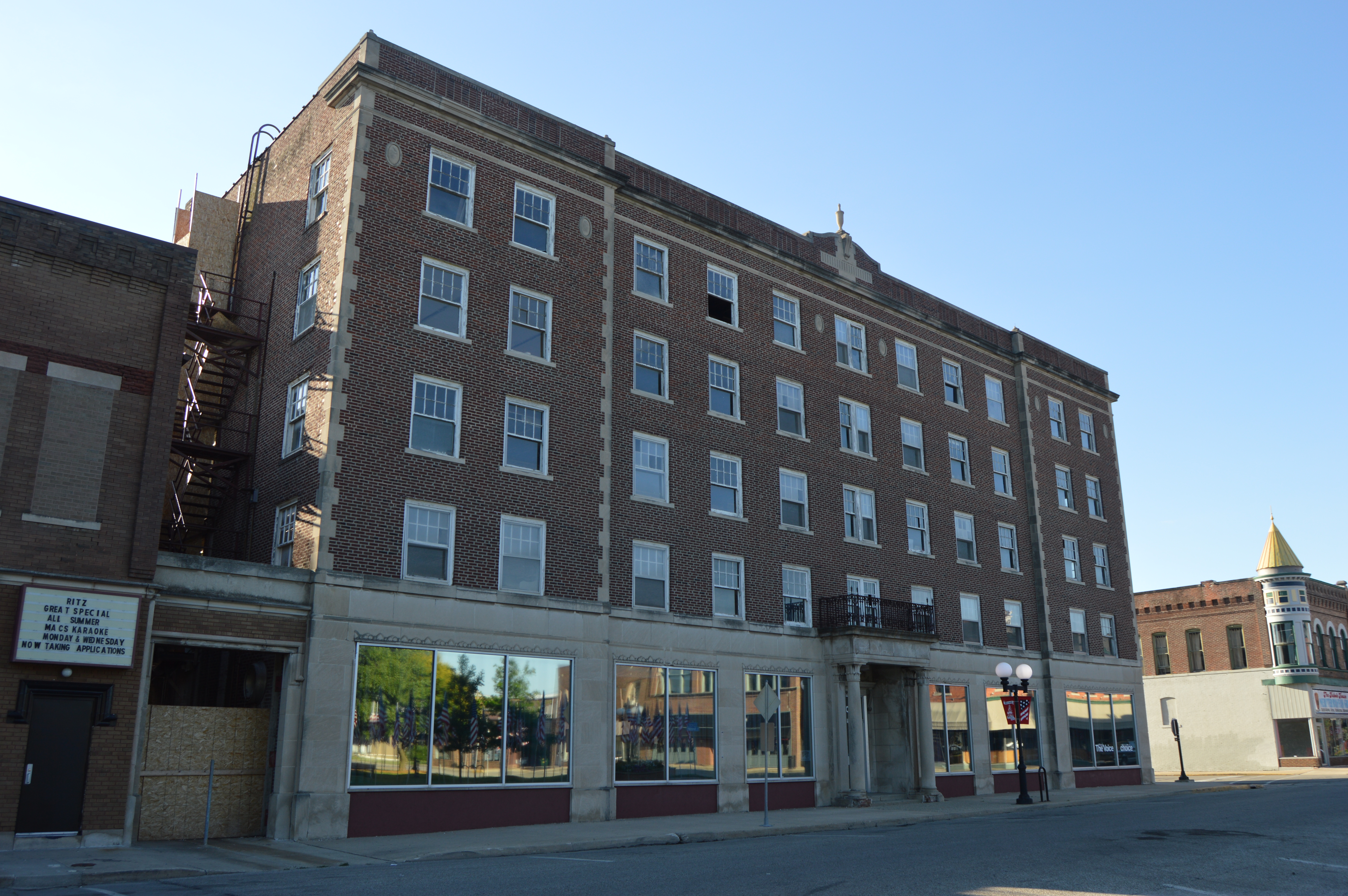

- Location within Illinois Location within the United States
- Location: 201 N. Randolph St., Macomb, Illinois
- Coordinates: 40°27′36″N 90°40′12″W
- Built: 1926-27
- Built by: Charles Van Etten
- Architect: F.E. Berger and R.L. Kelley
- Architectural style: Classical Revival
- NRHP reference No.: 10000760
- Added to NRHP: September 16, 2010

The Lamoine Hotel is a historic hotel located at 201 North Randolph Street in Macomb, Illinois. The hotel was built in 1926–27 to be the city's first large modern hotel, a necessity for a city with a busy railroad station and a state university. Architects F.E. Berger and R.L. Kelley of Champaign designed the Classical Revival building; it is the tallest building in downtown Macomb and the most prominent Classical Revival building in the city. In addition to hosting visitors to Macomb, the hotel housed several local businesses and hosted community meetings and the Macomb Chamber of Commerce. The hotel was the city's preferred hotel and community meeting place until the 1950s, when the automobile's rise took away the railroad traffic which gave the hotel much of its business. The hotel became an apartment hotel and ultimately closed for good in the following decades; the Macomb Journal later moved into the building's ground floor.

The hotel was added to the National Register of Historic Places on September 16, 2010.
