= Lamin Saine =

Gambian politician

Director-General of the National Intelligence Agency
- In office 2012 – 9 December 2013
- President: Yahya Jammeh

Nominated National Assembly Member
- Incumbent
- Assumed office 29 March 2012
- Appointed by: Yahya Jammeh

Personal details
- Party: APRC

Lamin K. Saine is a Gambian politician and former security official who is one of five nominated members of the National Assembly appointed by President Yahya Jammeh following the 2012 parliamentary election. Saine also served as Director-General of the National Intelligence Agency from 2012 to 2013.

== Early career ==
Saine has served in the Gambian Army at the rank of captain. In 2005, he published a novel, Ripped Apart, which was launched by Amadou Scattred Janneh, the information minister.

== National Intelligence Agency ==
Saine was a member of the National Intelligence Agency (NIA) prior to his appointment to the National Assembly. He has claimed that he was trained by MI6 and the FBI. On November 16, 2012, Saine was appointed NIA Deputy Director-General. Saine served as the NIA Director-General from 2012 to December 9, 2013.

In 2013, he was involved in the arrest and detainment of journalist Adboulie John. He was also the principal witness for the Gambian government in the Economic Community of West African States (ECOWAS) hearing on the murder of Deyda Hydara in 2011. In 2014, former NIA analyst Ousman Bojang accused Saine of withholding information about the March 2006 coup attempt from Jammeh in order to remove his then-superior, Daba Marena.

== Political career ==
Saine was nominated as a National Assembly Member following the 2012 parliamentary election, as one of the 5 NAMs nominated by the President. Speaking in the National Assembly in December 2016 during the 2016–2017 Gambian constitutional crisis and ECOWAS military intervention in the Gambia, Saine argued that, internal disputes ended by foreign intervention, tended to end in bloodshed. He said, "If you look at what happened in Liberia with foreign intervention, Syria and even in the Gambia during the 1981 failed attempted coup when foreign forces came, a lot of people lost their lives and properties."
