= Lamin (given name) =

Lamin is a masculine given name of Arabic origin. Notable people with the name include:

== Given name ==
- Lamin (rapper) (born 1995), Danish rapper and songwriter
- Lamin Kaba Bajo (born 1964), Gambian politician
- Lamin Barrow (born 1990), American football player from Louisiana
- Lamin Charty (born 1996), Gambian footballer
- Lamin Colley (born 1993), Gambian footballer
- Lamin Conateh (born 1981), Gambian footballer
- Lamin Conteh (1976–2022), Sierra Leonean footballer
- Lamin Deen (born 1981), British bobsledder
- Lamin Diallo (born 1991), Slovenian footballer
- Lamine Diarra (born 1983), Senegalese footballer
- Lamin N. Dibba (died 2020), Gambian politician
- Lamin Drammeh (born 1978), Gambian sprinter
- Lamin Khalifah Fhimah (1956–2026), Libyan accused murderer
- Lamin Fofana, American musician
- Lamin Jallow (born 1994), Gambian footballer
- Lamin Jusu Jarka (born 1958), Sierra Leonean disability rights activist
- Lamin Jawneh (born 1995), Gambian footballer
- Lamin Jawo (born 1995), Gambian footballer
- Lamin Marikong (born 1970), Gambian sprinter
- Lamin Newton, Antigua and Barbudan politician
- Lamin Saho, Gambian musician
- Lamin Saine, Gambian politician
- Lamin Samateh (born 1992), Gambian footballer
- Lamin Sarjo Samateh (born 1993), Gambian footballer
- Lamin Sanneh (1942–2019), American professor of Christianity
- Lamin Suma (born 1991), Sierra Leonean footballer
- Lamin Swann (1977–2023), American politician and businessman
- Lamin Tucker (born 1982), Sierra Leonean sprinter

== See also ==
- Lamine
