= Alamin Usman Alamin =

Mufti of Eritrea

Alamin Usman Alamin was the second Mufti of Eritrea. He was appointed in 1996 and died 17 May 2017. In 1954 he graduated from Al-Azhar University in Egypt.

== See also ==
- List of Muftis of Eritrea
