= Lamin Conateh =

Gambian footballer

Personal information
- Full name: Lamin Conateh
- Date of birth: October 1, 1981 (age 45)
- Place of birth: Bakau, Gambia
- Height: 1.81 m (5 ft 11 1/2 in)
- Position: Defender

Team information
- Current team: Arameiska-Syrianska Botkyrka IF
- Number: 14

Youth career
- 1997–1999: Steve Biko Football Club

Senior career*
Years	Team	Apps	(Gls)
1999–2005	Wallidan F.C.	38	
2005–2007	Bakau United Football Club	34	(2)
2007–2009	Assyriska Föreningen	54	(0)
2010–	Arameiska-Syrianska Botkyrka IF	24	(1)

International career
2001–2010	Gambia	7	(0)
- * Club domestic league appearances and goals

Lamin Conateh (born 1 October 1981 in Bakau) is a Gambian footballer, who currently plays for Arameiska-Syrianska Botkyrka IF.

== Career ==
Conateh began his career with Steve Biko Football Club in 1999 signed with Wallidan F.C. He left the team after four Gambian Championnat National D1 titles and joined in July 2005 to Bakau United Football Club. After a successful trial in January 2007 he signed with Superettan club Assyriska Föreningen.

== International career ==
Bakaye holds three games for his country on international stage.
