= Talibdin El-Amin =

American politician

Member of the Missouri House of Representatives from the 57th district
- In office 2007 – September 2009
- Succeeded by: Hope Whitehead

Personal details
- Party: Democratic

Talibdin El-Amin is an American politician. He was member of the Missouri House of Representatives for the 57th district.

In 2009, he resigned from office after pleading guilty to federal bribery charges. He was sentenced to 18 months in prison.
