= Conrad Leach =

British painter

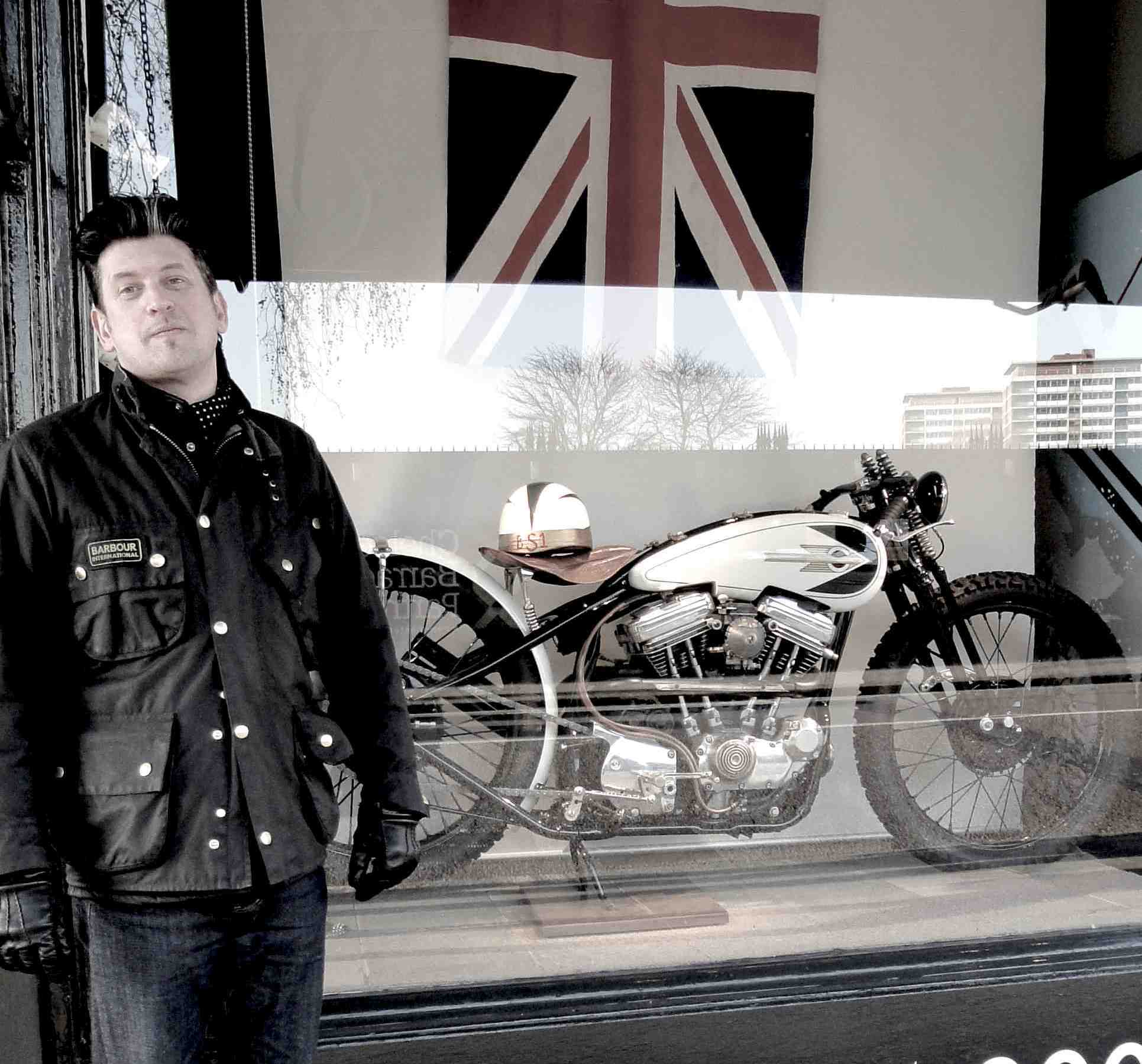
- Conrad Leach with his BS1
- Born: 22 November 1965 (age 60); Canterbury, Kent, England
- Occupations: Artist, motorcycle customiser
- Website: www.conradleach.com

Conrad Leach (born 22 November 1965 in Canterbury, Kent) is a British artist and custom motorcycle designer.

== Early life ==
Born in Canterbury, Kent, on 22 November 1965 to Beverley and Valerie Leach. Educated at Simon Langton Grammar School for Boys (Canterbury), Ravensbourne College of Art and Design (Chislehurst), and Middlesex Polytechnic (née Hornsey School of Art, Cockfosters).

== Work ==
Conrad Leach is a contemporary artist living in London, whose work is graphic and Pop-art inspired, with subject matter of celebrity portraiture, the romance of typically masculine pursuits of car and plane and motorcycle racing, plus symbols associated with the latter (logos, iron-on patches, flags, etc.). In addition to his portraits of legendary figures such as Jimi Hendrix, Leach has also been responsible for bringing the motorcycle culture into the art scene. His work is shown principally in Japan and England, although his first solo painting show in the US was held in February 2013, at Subvecta Motus Gallery in Los Angeles.

While in his 20s, Leach worked in the fashion industry, at the Burton Group, Dr Martens, and Harvey Nichols.

After 15 years in fashion, Leach began painting full-time in 1997 on large-scale acrylic canvases. His subjects were drawn from the world of film, television and music – iconic figures he felt had influenced his stylistic aesthetic. His first solo painting exhibition was at The Alphabet Bar in Soho, London in 2000, followed shortly by a solo show, 'Players', with the newly formed APART Gallery in Portobello Road, London.

In 2001, he became 'artist in residence' at CELUX (a division of the L.V.M.H. group based in Tokyo), where he showed annually until 2007. He was also commissioned to produce a series of large-scale images for the excavation machinery manufacturer J.C.B. This group of work is now hanging in the J.C.B. world headquarters in Rocester, UK. Leach made a series of images of Norwegian cultural icons to hang in the Grand Hotel in Oslo as part of Norway's 100 year anniversary of independence, in 2005. The pre-show launch was presented at the British Embassy. His image of writer Henrik Ibsen is now the visual identity for the Ibsen Museum in Oslo. In 2008, he was represented at Cafegroove in Tokyo, and also debuted large-scale motorcycle-related canvases at Legend of the Motorcycle Concours dElegance at the Ritz-Carlton Hotel, Half Moon Bay, California, and was commissioned to produce two canvases for the newly opened Grosvenor Estate project in Yoyogi Park, Tokyo. The next year, he gained representation in the UK at the Gauntlett Gallery, Pimlico Road, London.

In 2010, Leach's long-time association with vintage motorcycles inspired the design of the BS1, a Harley-Davidson Sportster engined custom motorcycle, which was built by Cro Custom of Los Angeles, California. The BS1 had its debut at the Quail Motorcycle Gathering, Carmel Valley, California. He relocated his studio from London to Los Angeles in 2014, where work is currently in progress on a new body of work.
In April 2015 was held London's custom motorcycle show The BikeShed for the first time in Paris, at the Carreau du Temple. His pictures were an impressive spread of supporting suppliers and artists – Conrad Leach offered this stunning selection of signed Giclée prints. His pictures named Gary, Speedway, Gloves Off and Norton Jack, the prints depict scenes from classic road racing, speedway, board-track and flat-track disciplines. Speaking to Classic Driver, Leach said, commenting the show in Paris:

Limited to just 100 examples each, the prints were taken from part of a show that took place last year in Los Angeles, called ‘United State’, examining the influence USA and UK bike culture had on each other from the '50s to '80s. The BikeShed event continues to go from strength to strength and I wish the organisers every success for round two in London, in May.

He has also developed a superb collaboration with Les Ateliers Ruby with the realization of a series of Pavillon and Castel helmets; a tribute to his famous Lucky13. Conrad Leach also collaborates with famous brands like Bearbrick to develop specific designs.
