= Lamine Kamara =

Guinean writer and essayist

- Born: 1940 (age 85–86)
- Occupations: Writer, novelist, essayist
- Notable work: Safrin ou Le Duel au fouet; Guinée : sous les verrous de la révolution; Les Racines de l'avenir : réflexion sur la Première République de Guinée; Mariame Waraba : ou le destin d'une femme

Lamine Kamara (born 1940) is a Guinean writer, novelist, and essayist.

== Biography ==
Lamine Kamara first worked as a teacher. In 1987, he became the Secretary-General of the Guinean National Commission for UNESCO.

== Works ==
- 1991: Safrin ou Le Duel au fouet, Présence Africaine
- 2012: Guinée : sous les verrous de la révolution, L'Harmattan (essay)
- 2012: Les Racines de l'avenir : réflexion sur la Première République de Guinée, L'Harmattan (essay)
- 2019: Mariame Waraba : ou le destin d'une femme; preceded by L'homme, L'Harmattan

== Awards and recognitions ==
- 2024: Named a Living Human Treasure of Guinea by the Center for Innovation and Research for Development (CIRD).
