= Nadhira Mohamed =

Sahrawi activist and actress

Nadhira Mohamed (born 1989) is a Spain-based Sahrawi activist and actress. She has been described by some academics as the first Sahrawi actress.

== Early life ==
Nadhira Mohamed, also known as Nadhira Luchaa Mohamed-Lamin or Nadhira Mohamed Buhoy, was born in a refugee camp in Tindouf, Algeria, in 1989.

Her father was the Polisario Front co-founder Luchaa Mohamed Lamin, and her native language is Hassaniya Arabic.

== Career ==
Mohamed is an actress and activist based in Valencia, Spain, having moved to the country in 2002.

Her first major acting role was in the 2011 film Wilaya, also known as Tears of Sand. The film took place in the Sahrawi refugee camps in Tindouf, where Mohamed herself once lived.

She was discovered and chosen to appear in the film when the filmmaker came across a photograph of her participating in a protest led by the Sahrawi activist Aminetu Haidar.

Mohamed won the Best Actress award at the Abu Dhabi Film Festival in 2011 for her performance of the lead role of Fatimetu in Wilaya. The Moroccan delegation left the room in protest when she was announced as the winner, due to the ongoing Western Sahara conflict.

Mohamed was also a candidate for the Goya Award for Best New Actress in 2013, though she was not nominated.

Mohamed later appeared in the 2015 documentary Life is Waiting: Referendum and Resistance in Western Sahara.
