= Danyul Brown =

Celebrity stylist (b. 1992)

Danyul Brown (born September 29, 1992) is a British-born celebrity stylist. His clients have included: singers John Legend, Demi Lovato, Yungblud, The Kid Laroi, Reiley, Becky G, Halle Bailey and Bebe Rexha, rapper Tyga, actors Angus Cloud, Joe Jonas, bands DNCE and Glass Animals, actress Leighton Meester, models Paris Jackson, Olivia Culpo, Brooklyn Beckham, and Lottie Moss, singer-songwriter Conor Maynard, and pop-rap duo Jack and Jack.

== Biography ==
Brown was born and raised in the North West of England, originally from the district of Murdishaw in the town of Runcorn. He studied at Halton High School in his hometown between the years of 2004 to 2009 followed by study at Priestley College in Warrington and left in 2011 to pursue an internship at Alexander McQueen fashion headquarters in the print design department in London. Whilst interning at McQueen, Brown made the decision to make London his permanent home and soon later attended Middlesex University where he studied Fashion Communication, Styling and Promotion, graduating in the year of 2014.

Upon graduating, Brown found his feet as Contributing Fashion Editor at London based menswear magazine, Client Magazine. His first project as Contributing Editor was a cover shoot with American pop band DNCE - fronted by actor and musician Joe Jonas.

Whilst at Client, Brown worked on multiple celebrity cover shoots, including one with musician John Legend, photographed by Editor-In-Chief, Ian Cole.

At 28 years old, Brown relocated to Los Angeles, California to pursue his dream of conquering the United States and quickly found his feet as one of the industry's most respected creatives. He went on to work with multiple high profile celebrities including Paris Jackson, The Kid Laroi, Angus Cloud, Brooklyn Beckham, Becky G, Halle Bailey, Olivia Culpo, Shanina Shaik, etc. He has since worked as Fashion Stylist and Creative Director on many global projects and campaigns including, but not limited to, KVD Beauty global makeup campaign, Variety Magazine 'Young Hollywood' cover special, Vogue Arabia cover special, Vogue Hong Kong cover special, Wonderland Magazine cover special, etc.

Brown currently resides in Los Angeles, California and is represented by The Only Agency.
