= Al Ameen School =

- Dubai; United Arab Emirates

Information
- School type: Independent school
- Established: 1985
- Status: Open
- Authority: KHDA
- Gender: Both
- Education system: British National Curriculum
- Website: https://www.msbdubai.com/

Al Ameen School is a British School located in Al Ghusais, Dubai, UAE. It is a private profit-making school. It has presently 500 students enrolled.

== KHDA Inspection Report ==
The Knowledge and Human Development Authority (KHDA) is an educational quality assurance authority based in Dubai, United Arab Emirates. It undertakes early learning, school and higher learning institution management and rates them as well.

A summary of the inspection ratings for Al Ameen School.

School name	2010-2011	2009-2010	2008-2009	Curriculum
Al Ameen School	Good	Acceptable	Unsatisfactory	UK

A summary of all the schools in Dubai's ratings can be found at KHDA School Ratings.
