= Lamine Ndiaye (French footballer) =

French footballer (born 1995)

Personal information
- Full name: Lamine Ndiaye
- Date of birth: 19 June 1995 (age 31)
- Place of birth: France
- Position: Defender

Team information
- Current team: GSI Pontivy
- Number: 26

Senior career*
Years	Team	Apps	(Gls)
–2014	Lorient		
2014–2015	Košice B	18	(0)
2015–2016	Košice	1	(0)
2016–????	GSI Pontivy		
- * Club domestic league appearances and goals as of 6 June 2015

Lamine Ndiaye (born 19 June 1995) is a French footballer who currently plays for CFA club GSI Pontivy as a defender.

== Club career ==
=== MFK Košice ===
Ndiaye started his career at Lorient but fail to make through first team and was released in June 2014. He made his professional Fortuna Liga debut for Košice on 19 May 2015 against ŽP Šport Podbrezová. He came back to France during 2016 summer mercato and sign with GSI Pontivy.
