= Lamine Diabira =

- Born: 1959; Somankidi, French Sudan (now Mali)
- Died: November 20, 2010 (aged 50–51) Between Mecca and Medina, Saudi Arabia
- Rank: Colonel
- Conflicts: 1991 Malian coup d'etat July 1991 Malian coup d'etat attempt

Lamine Diabira (1959 – November 20, 2010) was a Malian soldier and coup leader who participated in the 1991 Malian coup d'état and the July 1991 Malian coup d'etat attempt.

== Biography ==
Diabira was born in 1959 in Somankidi, French Sudan. He graduated from high school in Bamako and joined the army in 1972. In 1975, Diabira graduated from the Kati Military Academy in 1975 and received further military training in Germany, the United States, and France. He served as a commander of a reconnaissance team and as an instructor at Kati. Between 1986 and 1987, Diabira headed the research department at the Malian Army headquarters. In 1987, he was appointed Governor of Tombouctou Region.

Diabira was appointed a member of the National Reconciliation Council after the 1991 coup in Mali that overthrew Moussa Traoré. Diabira then served as the Minister of Regional Administration until July 15, when he and several other officers were arrested on charges of plotting a coup. Diabira, who opposed the transition to civilian rule, intended to assassinate interim President Amadou Toumani Touré. Amnesty International disputed the government's version of events, saying that Diabira and the alleged co-conspirators did not have a trail by 1993 and that Diabira was imprisoned for seeking to prosecute officers involved in the killing of 150 protesters in 1991. Diabira was also linked to financial crimes and fraud during his tenure as governor.

Diabira was released in 2003, and returned to the army as Chief of Staff of Manpower. In 2007, he was appointed Director of the Strategic Studies Department at the Ministry of Foreign Affairs. Diabira and General Amadou Baba Toure died in a traffic accident on November 20, 2010, while on hajj between Mecca and Medina. Diabira was a colonel at the time of his death and was set to be promoted to general.
