= Wilaya (film) =

- Theatrical release poster
- Directed by: Pedro Pérez Rosado
- Written by: Pedro Pérez Rosado
- Produced by: Jose María Morales
- Starring: Nadhira Mohamed, Memona Mohamed, Aziza Brahim, Ainina Sidagmet, Mohamed Mouloud
- Distributed by: Wanda Visión
- Release dates: 22 October 2011 (Abu Dhabi Film Festival); 4 May 2012 (Spain)
- Running time: 88 minutes
- Languages: Hassaniya; Spanish

Wilaya (Arabic: ولاية, also known as Tears of Sand) is a 2011 Spanish film directed by Pedro Pérez Rosado. The film is a minimalist drama about a Sahrawi refugee family suddenly confronted with the death of the mother and the return of the younger sister, who had lived most of her life in Spain, reflecting the separation of many Sahrawi families.

== Plot ==
Fatimetu is a Sahrawi girl who returns for the burial of her mother to the Sahrawi refugee camps after 16 years living in Spain. Her older brother Jatri tells Fatimetu that, in her last will, her mother left her both the family's jaima (tent) and the responsibility of taking care of her handicapped sister Hayat. Fatimetu reluctantly accepts the responsibility. She buys an old pickup truck and finds work transporting goods between the camps (wilayas), but Fatimetu is torn between life in the desert and the memories of her Spanish foster family and friends.

== Main cast ==
- Nadhira Mohamed — Fatimetu
- Memona Mohamed — Hayat
- Aziza Brahim — Sdiga
- Ainina Sidagmet — Said
- Mohamed Mouloud — Jatri

== Awards and nominations ==
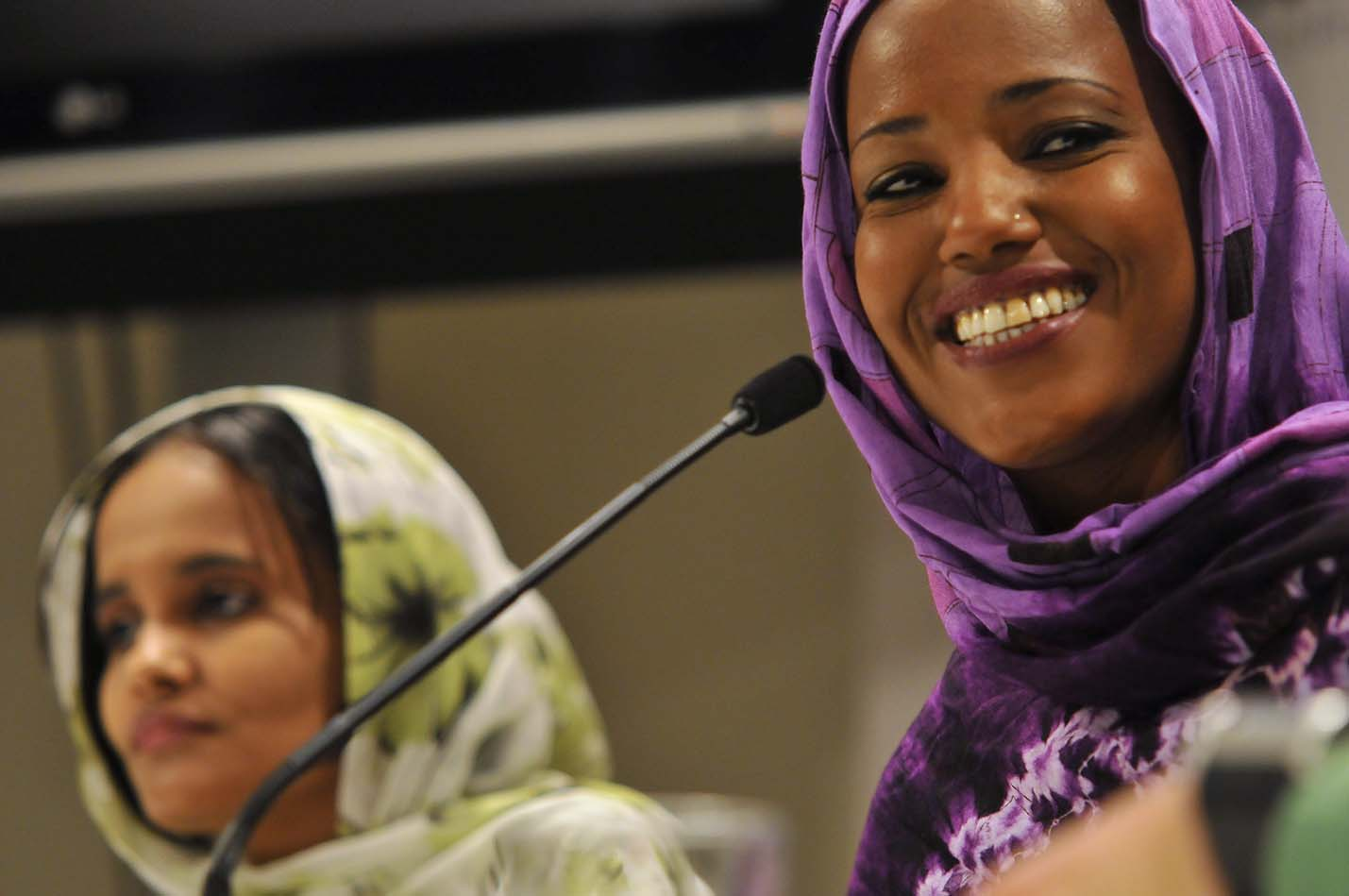
Sahrawi actresses Aziza Brahim and Memona Mohamed, during a press conference presentation of the movie "Wilaya", at the 10th Human rights film festival in San Sebastián, Spain, 26 April 2012

- Abu Dhabi Film Festival New Horizons Competition Best Actress (Memona Mohamed, winner)
- Malaga Film Festival Gold Biznaga Best Film (nominee)
- Malaga Film Festival Silver Biznaga Best Original Soundtrack (Aziza Brahim, winner)
- Luxor Egyptian & European Film Festival Gold Djed Feature Film Competition (winner)
- Algiers International Film Festival Best Fiction Feature Film Competition (nominee)

== Filming locations ==
The film was shot entirely at the Sahrawi refugee camps located in Tinduf, Algeria.
