= Lamine Mili =

American engineer

Lamine Mili is an American electrical engineer from Virginia Tech in Blacksburg, Virginia. He was named a Fellow of the Institute of Electrical and Electronics Engineers (IEEE) in 2016 for his contributions to robust state estimation for power systems.
