= Mohamed Al-Amin Mohamed Al-Hadi =

Somali politician

Mohamed Al-Amin Mohamed Al-Hadi (also spelled Muhammad al Amin Muhammad al Hadi) was born in Brava or Barawa on 23 May 1967. He is a member of the Somali Parliament and Director and founder of Alshahid Centre for Research and Media Studies.
