= Sarah Lavoine =

French interior designer

- Born: 3 March 1973; Neuilly-sur-Seine
- Occupation: Interior designer
- Spouse(s): Marc Lavoine
- Parent(s): Sabine Marchal
- Awards: Knight of the National Order of Merit (2021)
- Website: www.maisonsarahlavoine.com

Sarah Lavoine is a designer and interior designer practicing in France.

== Life ==
Lavoine is the daughter of Jean Stanislas Poniatowski, a longtime director of Vogue magazine, and Sabine Marchal, a decorator, who was the sister of Marie Poniatowski, a jeweler. Lavoine is a descendant of Polish nobility.

Lavoine grew up in France, where she first studied theater, philosophy, and communication, before turning to interior design. In 1995, she married singer Marc Lavoine, with whom she has three children.

Pushed and initiated by the interior designer François Schmidt, Lavoine created her first decoration projects at the beginning of the 2000s, and established her eponymous company, Sarah Lavoine, in 2002. In 2009, she designed a collection of interior furniture and accessories for La Redoute. In 2010, she presented the show Design by Sarah Lavoine on the Odyssée channel (later Stylia), and also published a book, Interior Architecture, published by Martinière. She opened her first shop in Paris, on rue Saint-Roch.

In 2012, CFOC (Compagnie Française de l'Orient and China) called on Lavoine to reopen her store. The same year, she launched her own collection of decorative objects. The following year, she opened her second boutique in Paris.

Subsequently, Lavoine inaugurated the Elle Café in Tokyo, remade the Club 13, opened a fourth shop in Passy, and collaborated with Sushi Shop and with Delacre.

In March 2018, Sarah Lavoine revealed her separation with Marc Lavoine after twenty three years of marriage.

== Bibliography ==
- Sarah Lavoine; Caroline Wietzel; Guillaume de Laubier. Sarah Lavoine : Architecture intérieure. Paris: Éditions de la Martinière. ISBN 978-2732442785.
- Ainsi soit style, Paris, Éditions Fayard, coll. « Témoignages/Doc/Actu », 2015, 192 p. ISBN 978-2-213-69390-3
