= Lamin, North Bank Division =

Coordinates: 13.3511°N 16.4315°W

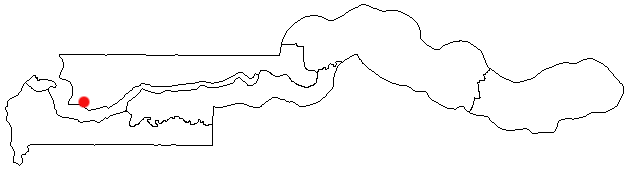
Location of Lamin in the Gambia

Lamin is a town located in the North Bank Division of the Gambia. It should not be confused with the larger city of Lamin located in the Western Division near the national capital, Banjul.
