= Lamin, Western Division =

Lamin, Western Division, Gambia
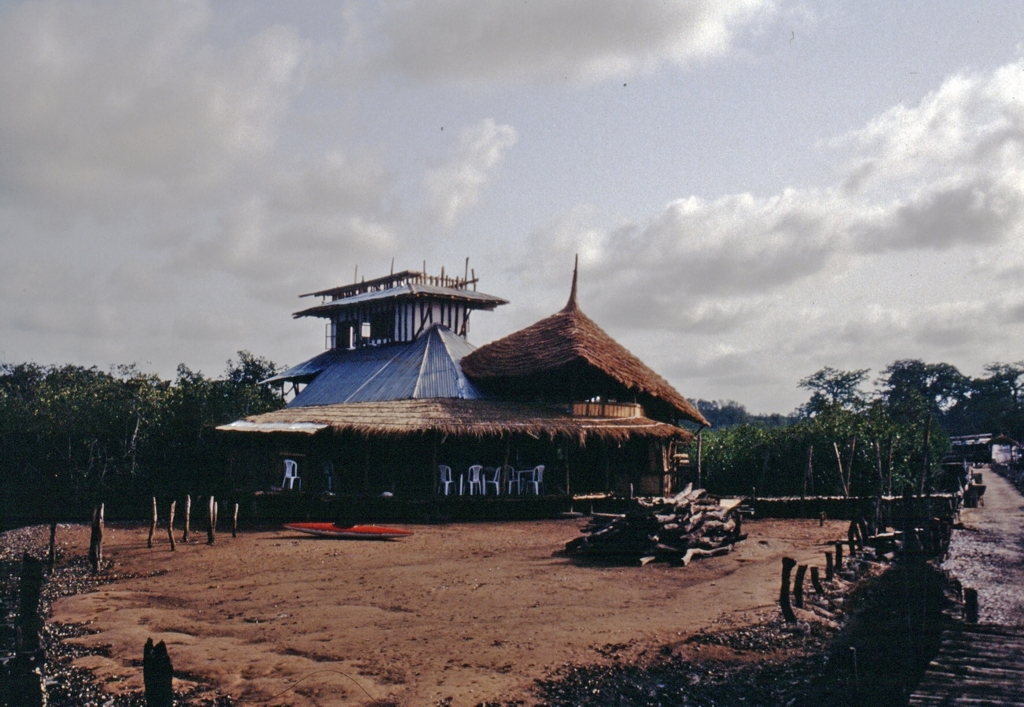

- Location in the Gambia
- Coordinates: 13°23′N 16°39′W
- Country: The Gambia
- Division: Western Division

Lamin is the largest village in Kombo North Western Division of the Gambia. A village with three large clans, Bojang, Jammeh and Manneh, as the founders, and all the rest are considered "lountan" meaning "strangers" in Manidinko. There is a village leader, "AlKalo" who is from the lineage of the Bojang. Until recently the village was divided into zones marked by tribes, the Mandinkos in Sateba, the Jolas in Sanchaba, the Manjako in Wayeto and all the other tribes in Temasu.

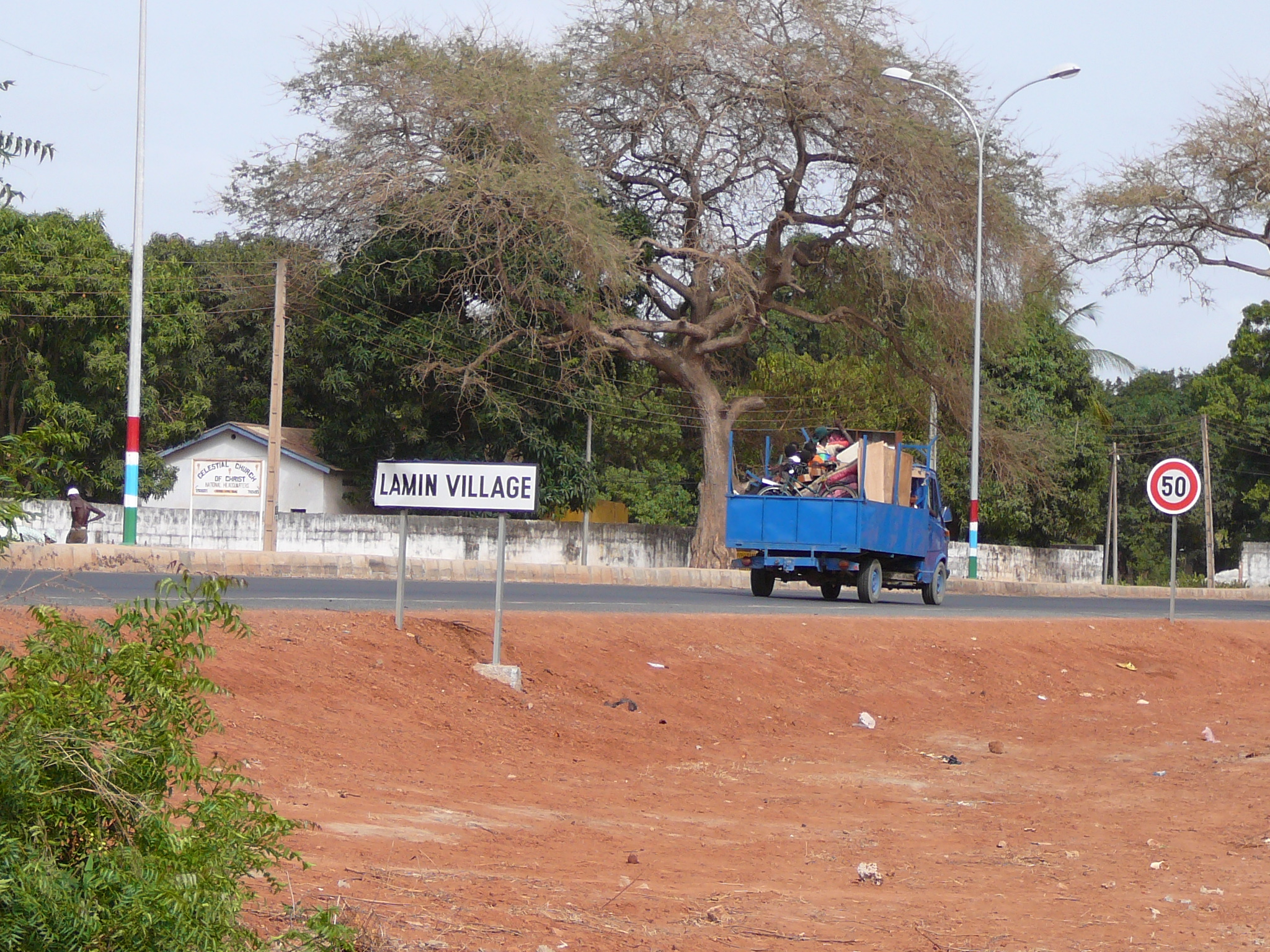

A second, small town named Lamin is located in the North Bank Division.

The village is twinned with Darwen, United Kingdom.
