= Mumtaz Ahmed Khan (humanitarian) =

Indian humanitarian (1935–2021)

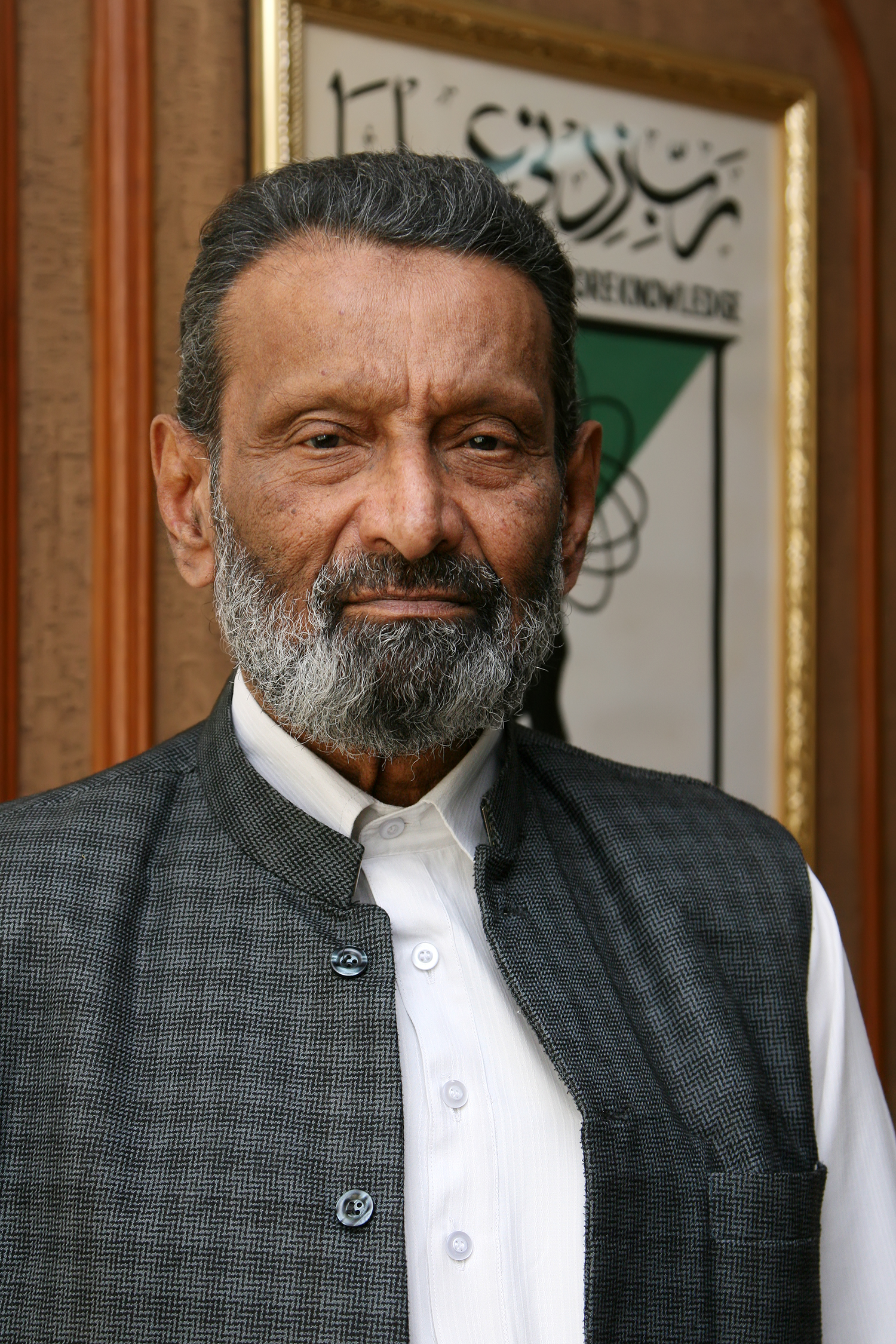
- Khan in 2012
- Born: ممتاز احمد خان; 6 September 1935; Pune, Maharashtra, India
- Died: 28 May 2021 (aged 85); Bengaluru, India
- Other names: Dr Sahab and Baba-e-taalim, Living Syed Ahmed Khan
- Education: MBBS, MS.
- Alma mater: Madras University; Chennai, India
- Known for: Al-Ameen Movement & Al-Ameen Educational Society
- Spouse: Zarin Taj
- Parent(s): Sadat-un-Nissa Begum (Mother); Yousuf Ismail Khan (Father)
- Awards: See article

Signature
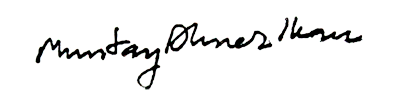

Mumtaz Ahmed Khan (6 September 1935 – 28 Μay 2021) was an Indian humanitarian, educationist and social reformer known for founding the Al-Ameen Educational Society and its corresponding colleges. Khan earned a MBBS degree from Madras University, Chennai, and became a general practitioner. In 1966, at the age of 31, he founded the Al-Ameen Educational Society.

Khan was a founder-trustee of an Urdu daily newspaper, the Salar Daily. He was also Pro Chancellor/ Treasurer of Aligarh Muslim University.

He chaired the Al-Ameen Educational Society, a post he took up in 2009 after Sadaqat Piran. He died on 27 May 2021 in Bengaluru.

== Family ==
Khan was born to an advocate father, Yousuf Ismail Khan, and Sadat-un-Nissa Begum, a BA holder; both his parents being graduates from the Aligarh Muslim University. He had one sibling, his sister Naseem Firdous, who has had intellectual disability since birth.

He married Zarin Taj on 27 December 1964 in Bangalore in an arranged marriage set up by their families, who knew one another prior to the marriage.

His maternal grandfather was considerably well off. After inheriting from him, Khan moved to Bangalore from Tiruchirappalli, liquidating his assets as he set up a surgical practice in 1965.

== Education ==
Khan did his MBBS at Madras University, Chennai in 1963. After getting married he continued his postgraduate studies, M.S. specializing in surgery at Stanley Medical College, Chennai.

== Al Ameen Movement ==
At the age of 31, in 1966 Khan founded the Al-Ameen Movement, Al-which runs 250+ educational institutions with more than 2.5 lakhs students across the country. Starting from Pre-Nursery School, it has all types of educational institutes including medical & engineering colleges.

Abbasiya Begum, a member of the Karnataka Legislative Council, was elected the first chairperson of this society.

=== Institutions Run By Al-Ameen ===
- Al-Ameen College of Pharmacy
- Al-Ameen College of Law
- Al-Ameen Arts, Science and Commerce Degree College
- Al-Ameen College of Education
- Al-Ameen Institute of Management Studies
- Al-Ameen Institute of Information Sciences
- Al-Ameen Pre University College
- Al-Ameen Primary & High School
- Al-Ameen Quest Academy

Founder of Al Ameen Medical College Bijapur.

== Accolades ==
Khan was awarded numerous accolades for his work. The Dr Mumtaz Ahmed Khan Best Teachers’ Awards are named after him. The most important ones are:

- AFMI | American Federation of Muslims from India (AFMI) Award
- Kempegowda Award
- Karnataka Rajyothsava Award (1990) for Education by Government of Karnataka
- Junior Jaycees Award
- Public Relations Society of India Award
- All India Manufacturer's Organization (AIMO) Award
- Federation of Senior Citizen Forums of Karnataka Award
