= Responses to the COVID-19 pandemic in August 2020 =

Aspect of the coronavirus outbreak

This article documents the chronology of the response to the COVID-19 pandemic in August 2020, which originated in Wuhan, China in December 2019. Some developments may become known or fully understood only in retrospect. Reporting on this pandemic began in December 2019.

== Reactions and measures at the United Nations ==
=== 1 August ===
The WHO Emergency Committee expressed “appreciation for WHO and partners’ COVID-19 pandemic response efforts”, while noting that there was no an end in sight to a crisis that had so far infected over 17 million people and resulted in over 650,000 deaths, stressing that the impact would last for decades.

=== 3 August ===
The World Health Organization’s Emergency Committee on COVID-19 met to review the current coronavirus pandemic at what Director-General Tedros Adhanom Ghebreyesus called “a sobering moment” due to the pandemic's massive direct and ripple effects, with a warning of "no silver bullet".

UNICEF warned that storms and coronavirus posed a ‘double threat’ for children in Central America and Caribbean.

=== 4 August ===
Secretary-General António Guterres issued recommendations to get children back in the classroom in a new UNESCO policy brief Education During COVID-19 And Beyond: "The Future Of Education Is Here", launched alongside a new global campaign called Save our Future, as the UN estimates 1 billion children were affected by school closures in July.

The UN launched a COVID-19 Response Plan for the Philippines, to provide "critical health interventions and multi-sectoral humanitarian assistance" to those in epidemic hotspots in its largest country response since 2013, the UN response to Typhoon Haiyan/Yolanda.

=== 5 August ===
The World Health Organization reported that a new “surge team” of leading UN health experts was traveling to South Africa to help with the COVID-19 response there, as the country was now among the top five of the world's most affected countries.

=== 6 August ===
Addressing the Aspen Security Forum, consisting of top-level present and former United States government officials, Tedros Adhanom Ghebreyesus, Director-General of the World Health Organization (WHO), appealed to countries to unite against the disease, stressing that there were more than 18.5 million cases of COVID-19 worldwide and 700,000 deaths.

The UN World Food Programme (WFP) and governments announced that a flight carrying "protective masks, ventilators and other essential medical supplies for COVID-19 response" had landed in Papua New Guinea, commencing a humanitarian air service for the Pacific region.

=== 7 August ===
As the Americas remained the epicenter of the COVID-19 pandemic, and on the International Day of the World's Indigenous Peoples, the UN High Commissioner for Human Rights affirmed "the need to ensure the world’s indigenous people have control over their own communities", given the "critical threat" of COVID-19 to indigenous peoples.

Special Rapporteurs and Independent Experts, part of the Special Procedures of the Human Rights Council, again called on countries to ease or lift sanctions to allow affected countries and communities "like Cuba, Iran, Sudan, Syria, Venezuela and Yemen" access vital supplies in the fight against the COVID-19 pandemic.

=== 10 August ===
The International Organization for Migration and International Chamber of Commerce released new employer guidance for measures to protect migrant workers.

The Director-General of the World Health Organization (WHO) pointed to 'green shoots of hope' in the pandemic, while stressing two main WHO recommendations, that “leaders must step up to take action and citizens need to embrace new measures”.

=== 12 August ===
Secretary-General António Guterres briefed the UN Security Council on sustainable peace and the progress of the global ceasefire, warning that COVID-19 threatened hard-won development and peacebuilding gains and “risks exacerbating conflicts or fomenting new ones”.

=== 13 August ===
The Director-General of the World Health Organization stated that the agency's main mission was now "focused on shepherding global vaccine candidates through the necessary trials", then "guaranteeing rapid, fair and equitable access" to vaccines for every country.

=== 15 August ===
A UN-coordinated televised and digitally streamed concert, Pacific Unite: Saving Lives Together, appealed for regional leaders and citizens of the Pacific to unite as part of the global battle against COVID-19.

=== 18 August ===
The Director-General of the World Health Organization warned against “vaccine nationalism” in the COVID-19 pandemic, stating that he had written to WHO Member States, urging them to join COVAX, a mechanism to guarantee fair access to effective immunization for all countries.

=== 20 August ===
The World Health Organization (WHO) and UNICEF, citing research, urged African governments to promote a safe return of schoolchildren to classrooms while limiting spread of COVID-19.

=== 21 August ===
The Food and Agriculture Organization and the World Food Programme, citing data showing that over 3 million people are facing acute food insecurity due to COVID-19 and conflict, called for urgent, sustained humanitarian action in Burkina Faso. As global cases of COVID-19 topped 22 million cases, with 780,000 deaths, and with several countries experiencing fresh COVID-19 outbreaks, the World Health Organization urged countries "to quickly identify and prevent clusters, to prevent community transmission and the possibility of new restrictions”.

=== 24 August ===
UN Secretary-General António Guterres launched his latest policy brief, on tourism, calling for the vital global tourism sector to be rebuilt in a "safe, equitable and climate friendly way". The WHO urged greater investment in the global COVID-19 vaccine facility, the COVAX Global Vaccines Facility, which 172 countries are now participating in and which aims to deliver two billion doses in 2021. UN Special Rapporteurs and Independent Experts on human rights have raised alarm over “grave and unnecessary” risks of catching COVID-19 faced by imprisoned human rights defenders facing lengthy pre-trial detention in Egypt.

=== 25 August ===
The WHO announced only a slim possibility of COVID-19 reinfection, citing documented cases of 1 in over 23 million.

=== 27 August ===
The WHO has announced the setting up of an independent expert Review Committee to examine aspects of the international treaty that governs preparedness and response to health emergencies. UNAIDS has warned in a new report, Rights in a pandemic – Lockdowns, rights and lessons from HIV in the early response to COVID-19, that some of the world's most marginalized communities have experienced violence and other rights abuses during the COVID-19 pandemic.

=== 31 August ===
The WHO Director-General warned that kickstarting economies without a COVID-19 plan was a ‘recipe for disaster’, while advising on the measures that individuals, communities and governments, communities could take to ensure safety. Addressing a virtual town hall with young women from NGOs, part of the annual session of the Commission on the Status of Women, coordinated by UN Women, the UN Secretary-General stated that the COVID-19 pandemic had reversed decades of fragile progress on gender equality and women's rights.

== Reactions and measures in Africa ==
Map of the WHO's regional offices and their respective operating regions. Africa; HQ: Brazzaville, Republic of the Congo Western Pacific; HQ: Manila, Philippines Eastern Mediterranean; HQ: Cairo, Egypt South East Asia; HQ: New Delhi, India Europe; HQ: Copenhagen, Denmark Americas; HQ: Washington, D.C., US

=== 1 August ===
Kenya's national airline Kenya Airways resumed international flights after they were suspended in March due to the coronavirus pandemic.

=== 3 August ===
In the Gambia, Finance Minister Mambury Njie, Energy Minister Fafa Sanyang, and Agriculture Minister Amie Fabureh all tested positive for COVID-19, and will subsequently self-isolated and performed remote work, making the total number of cabinet ministers infected with the virus five.

South Africa's anti-corruption organisation announced that it was investigating irregularities in several aspects of the government's handling of the COVID-19 pandemic, amid concerns that senior officials gained access to millions of rand of financial aid.

=== 4 August ===
The mayor of Kanifing District in The Gambia, Talib Bensouda, tested positive for COVID-19 and was admitted to hospital for treatment, becoming the sixth senior politician in the country to test positive.

Nigerian private airline Air Peace announced that salaries have been cut and that around 70 pilots have been made redundant due to the impact of the COVID-19 pandemic on aviation.

Vice-President of Zimbabwe Constantino Chiwenga was announced as the country's new Health Minister, following the dismissal of previous minister Obadiah Moyo over several corruption allegations relating to the government's handling of the coronavirus pandemic.

=== 5 August ===
Gambian President Adama Barrow declared a state of emergency in the country due to a large surge in coronavirus infections, closing the country's land, sea and air borders to everyone except diplomatic staff and essential delivery drivers. Schools and places of worship were also closed, although essential businesses were permitted to reopen. A night-time curfew was also introduced for three weeks to attempt to lower the transmission of the virus.

=== 6 August ===
Nigerian Aviation Minister Hadi Sirika stated that commercial international flights to and from the country will be permitted to resume in "weeks rather than months".

South African President Cyril Ramaphosa announced that a committee will be established to investigate alleged corruption linked to the government's handling of the coronavirus pandemic, as well as businesses supplying personal protective equipment.

=== 7 August ===
The South African Rugby Union announced that approval had been given for full-contact training sessions and games, and therefore organisers were aiming to restart tournaments in September.

=== 8 August ===
The Algerian government announced a further easing of coronavirus lockdown restrictions, with bans on non-essential travel lifted across much of the country to the end of the month, with the night-time curfew shortened. Mosques with capacities greater than 1,000 people will be permitted to reopen from 15 August.

Kenyan President Uhuru Kenyatta stated that the country's hospitality industry was ready to receive both domestic and international travellers, and thus urged Kenyans to travel in order to reduce the economic consequences of the COVID-19 pandemic.

=== 9 August ===
Authorities in Malawi announced that bars and places of worship will be forced to close to slow the increasing spread of coronavirus in the country; face masks will also be mandatory in all public areas and social gatherings will be limited to ten people. The Attorney General stated that law enforcement officers will be dispatched to ensure that the public comply with the new restrictions.

=== 13 August ===
The Africa Centres for Disease Control and Prevention announced that seven countries - Cameroon, Liberia, Morocco, Nigeria, Sierra Leone, Zambia and Zimbabwe - will begin administering COVID-19 antibody tests to begin to understand the extent of the spread of coronavirus around the continent.

== Reactions and measures in the Americas ==
=== 1 August ===
Health officials in the Costa Rican capital of San José dispatched a mobile laboratory team to the Costa Rica-Nicaragua border to provide free COVID-19 tests to migrants stranded at the border after the Nicaraguan government announced that anybody unable to provide evidence of a negative result will be prohibited from entering the country.

Governor of Puerto Rico Wanda Vázquez Garced extended restrictions imposed to control the spread of the coronavirus pandemic, with cinemas, bars and gyms remaining closed until at least 15 August, with beaches closed to people not exercising every day except Sundays. Puerto Rico's night-time curfew was also retained with no large social gatherings permitted; authorities also stated that anybody refusing to wear a face mask in a public space could face prosecution.

American technology company Google stated that twenty US states and territories are experimenting with contact tracing technology developed by the company, with sixteen countries already using the Exposure Notification app developed jointly by Google and Apple Inc.

=== 2 August ===
White House Chief of Staff Mark Meadows stated that he was not optimistic that American politicians will reach an agreement in the near future on further legislation aimed at relieving economic pressure on families and businesses affected by the pandemic.

=== 3 August ===
Chief of Staff in the Brazilian Presidency Walter Souza Braga Netto tested positive for COVID-19, and will subsequently self-isolate and work from home, making him the seventh government minister to contract coronavirus.

Authorities in Honduras extended the country's coronavirus curfew by a further week, now scheduled to end on 9 August, due to rising rates of infection both domestically and internationally.

In the United States, staff in over thirty school districts organised protests against the American government's plans to fully reopen schools at the end of the summer break due to surging coronavirus cases in the country; they urged the government to reconsider the plans and allow lessons to be held virtually until there is substantial scientific evidence supporting the physical reopening of schools, with several safety measures implemented such as the wearing of face masks and smaller class sizes.

=== 4 August ===
Secretary-General of the Brazilian Presidency Jorge de Oliveira Francisco tested positive for COVID-19 and will subsequently work from home, becoming the eighth cabinet minister to test positive.

The United States Government announced that late stage clinical trials have begun of a potential antibody treatment and several experimental therapeutics for treating moderately-affected COVID-19 patients, developed jointly by Canadian biotechnology company AbCellera and American firm Eli Lilly and Company.

=== 5 August ===
Canadian Procurement Minister Anita Anand announced that the government had reached an agreement with American pharmaceutical companies Pfizer and Moderna to secure millions of doses of potential COVID-19 vaccines; Anand also stated that negotiations were ongoing with several other domestic and international companies to secure doses.

In the United States, data from the ADP National Employment Report shows that only 170,000 private company employees were hired in July, a stark contrast to over 4 million hired in June, with data also suggesting that there are 13 million fewer people employed in the US than in February, attributed directly to the economic impact of the coronavirus pandemic.

The Chicago Teachers Union announced that schools will not reopen physically after the summer break in September, with lessons conducted online to prevent coronavirus transmission.

Mayor of New York City Bill de Blasio announced that coronavirus checkpoints will be established on major entry points to New York City to ensure that travellers arriving from states deemed to have unsafe levels of transmission stay in quarantine for two weeks, with fines of up to $10,000 for anyone caught breaching the orders.

=== 6 August ===
The Supreme Federal Court of Brazil ruled that President Jair Bolsonaro must impose measures to prevent the spread of coronavirus to the country's indigenous communities, widely understood to be at a higher risk of developing severe cases of COVID-19. The government was given thirty days to implement suitable measures, and should include barriers to stop non-residents entering tribal lands.

United States President Donald Trump stated that the US could potentially have a COVID-19 vaccine by 3 November, the date of the 2020 presidential election.

Governor of Ohio Mike DeWine tested positive for COVID-19 and will subsequently self-isolate and work from his home in Cedarville.

The United States Department of State lifted the Global Level 4 Health Advisory, which advised citizens against all non-essential international travel, based on data from the Centers for Disease Control and Prevention.

Panama's national brewery starts making face masks at an in house facility to protect its employees.

=== 7 August ===
Brazilian President Jair Bolsonaro announced that 1.9 billion real (equivalent to $356 million) will be allocated to the development of a potential COVID-19 vaccine by the University of Oxford and AstraZeneca, with Health Minister Eduardo Pazuello stating that the vaccine could be available as early as December.

Governor of New York Andrew Cuomo announced that the state's schools will reopen fully after the summer break due to declining coronavirus cases, although some virtual lessons will still take place.

=== 9 August ===
The Executive Director of Oxfam in Brazil, Katia Maia, urged international and domestic authorities to conduct an investigation into Brazil's recorded coronavirus deaths, which passed 100,000 on 8 August, as well as the perceived failure of President Jair Bolsonaro and other government ministers in dealing with the pandemic.

=== 10 August ===
Disputed President of Venezuela Nicolás Maduro extended the country's state of alert by a further thirty days to attempt to slow the spread of coronavirus.

=== 11 August ===
Health officials in the Brazilian state of Paraná revealed that negotiations were ongoing with Russian authorities to enable production of a potential COVID-19 vaccine approved by the country's drug regulator. The governor of Paraná Ratinho Júnior will meet with the Russian Ambassador to Brazil on 12 August to discuss the proposals.

Mexican Foreign Minister Marcelo Ebrard announced that late-stage clinical trials of three different potential COVID-19 vaccines developed by American company Johnson & Johnson and Chinese companies CanSino Biologics and Walvax Biotechnology, with the aim of eventually securing doses of the vaccines once the results of the trials are published.

In the U.S. state of Georgia, the Cherokee County School District announced that over 800 students and over 40 staff have been advised to enter a period of quarantine due to possible exposure to COVID-19.

Health authorities in the United States revealed that an agreement has been reached with the biotechnology company Moderna to secure 100 million doses of the company's potential COVID-19 vaccine for a cost of $1.5 billion.

=== 12 August ===
Health officials in the Brazilian state of Paraná reached an agreement to produce a vaccine developed by Russian researchers and approved by the country's drug regulator, despite international concern surrounding the safety and efficacy of the vaccine.

Peruvian President Martín Vizcarra announced that a full lockdown will be reimposed on Sundays and that family gatherings will be prohibited due to a spike in coronavirus infections.

=== 13 August ===
President of Argentina Alberto Fernández and Mexican Foreign Minister Marcelo Ebrard announced that the two countries will produce 150 million doses of a COVID-19 vaccine being developed by British pharmaceutical company AstraZeneca to supply to all Latin American countries, with the exception of Brazil; Ebrard later revealed that the number of doses could be increased to 250 million.

Mexican Energy Secretariat Rocío Nahle García announced that she would continue to work from home and self-isolate after testing positive for COVID-19.

In the United States, presumptive Democratic presidential nominee Joe Biden called for state governors to impose legislation mandating the wearing of face masks in all areas, and stated that all American citizens should wear masks in outdoor areas for at least the next three months.

== Reactions and measures in the Eastern Mediterranean ==
=== 1 August ===
The Kuwaiti Directorate General of Civil Aviation banned commercial flights to over thirty countries authorities deem to have unsafe levels of coronavirus transmission. Countries to which flights were suspended include Brazil, China, Egypt, India and Spain.

=== 2 August ===
Iraq's Civil Aviation Authority suspended all flights between Iraq and Turkey following a surge in coronavirus infections in Turkey.

=== 5 August ===
Authorities in Oman announced that a ban on domestic travel between the country's provinces will be lifted on 8 August after it was initially imposed to control possible coronavirus transmission during the Islamic festival of Eid al-Adha. The country's curfew will also be shortened for a week, although all restrictions in Dhofar Governorate will be maintained.

=== 8 August ===
Schools reopened in the Gaza Strip with strict hygiene regulations in place; the Education Ministry stated that classes would be limited to four a day and schools would initially hold remedial classes only.

=== 11 August ===
The Gaza-Egypt border temporarily reopened for limited crossings after being closed since March. A spokesperson for the Palestinian Interior Ministry announced that Palestinian citizens in possession of foreign passports and residency permits, or people with urgent medical needs, will be permitted to leave the Gaza Strip.

=== 12 August ===
Jordan's Interior Ministry announced that the country's only land border crossing with Syria will be closed for a week from 13 August.

=== 13 August ===
The Kuwaiti Government announced that the country will move into the fourth phase of reopening after the coronavirus pandemic on 18 August, with non-essential businesses including gyms and beauty salons permitted to reopen, although the night-time curfew will be maintained; sports fixtures will also be allowed to resume from 15 August without the presence of spectators.

== Reactions and measures in Europe ==
=== 1 August ===
French authorities began testing travellers arriving from countries deemed to be at higher risk of coronavirus transmission at sixteen of the country's main international transport hubs after Prime Minister Jean Castex announced the measure in July, with anybody testing positive required to enter a mandatory two week quarantine; travellers who present evidence of a negative COVID-19 test result received less than three days before travel are exempt.

International flights to and from Russia resumed at Sheremetyevo International Airport in Moscow, and cinemas reopened at a reduced capacity across the country as part of a further easing of coronavirus restrictions; customers at cinemas were required to maintain a strict social distance and have their temperatures checked on arrival.

Russian Health Minister Mikhail Murashko revealed governmental plans to carry out a mass vaccination campaign against COVID-19 in October, with healthcare and educational personnel announced to be the first to receive a vaccine.

In the United Kingdom, shielding of people in vulnerable categories in England, Scotland and Northern Ireland ended, enabling those previously shielding to return to work; they will no longer be entitled to receive food parcels and medication deliveries from the government. British Prime Minister Boris Johnson also announced an easing of coronavirus restrictions scheduled to take place over the weekend would be delayed to at least 15 August following rises in infection rates in several areas of the country, with casinos, bowling alleys, facial beauty salons and indoor entertainment remaining closed.

=== 2 August ===
The Cypriot Health Ministry announced that all travellers arriving into the country from Greece from 5 August will be required to receive a mandatory COVID-19 test if they cannot produce evidence of a negative test result received less than three days before arrival, following a surge in infections in Greece.

French authorities stated that they would request for European Union leaders to impose financial sanctions on any member state undermining basic human rights under the union's coronavirus pandemic recovery fund.

In the United Kingdom, the Greater Manchester Combined Authority declared a major incident throughout the county after the British government announced that coronavirus restrictions will be tightened in the area. Authorities later stated that the major incident was declared to enable key organisations to access resources to prevent further transmission of the virus.

=== 3 August ===
Health authorities in the French cities of Lille and Nice announced that face masks will be mandatory in all outdoor public spaces, in addition to all indoor areas, to attempt to lower the rate of coronavirus transmission; police in Lille stated that anybody caught breaking the regulations on face masks will receive a fine of 135 euros. French Prime Minister Jean Castex also urged the public to remain vigilant, stating that "the virus is not on holiday and neither are we".

Schools reopened in the German state of Mecklenburg-Vorpommern with no requirement for students to wear face masks, despite Education Minister Anja Karliczek advocating such a measure.

Authorities in Greece announced that face masks will be mandatory on outdoor areas on board ships until 18 August following a surge in infections in the country.

Polish Health Minister Łukasz Szumowski stated that law enforcement officers will be performing checks on shops to ensure they are complying with the government's COVID-19 restrictions.

Norwegian Health Minister Bent Høie announced that cruise ships carrying more than 100 passengers will be prohibited from disembarking at Norwegian ports for two weeks, after more than 40 passengers and crew tested positive on board the MS Roald Amundsen. The new restrictions will not apply to scheduled domestic and international ferry companies. Operator of the MS Roald Amundsen Hurtigruten announced that all of the company's cruises will be suspended until further notice.

=== 4 August ===
Bulgarian health authorities announced that fans will be permitted to return to sports stadiums as long as they take up no more than fifty per cent of the venue's capacity when the First Professional Football League resumes on 7 August.

French President Emmanuel Macron announced that each care home worker in France will be entitled to receive a bonus of 500 euros as a show of gratitude for their role in fighting the coronavirus pandemic; the overall package will be worth 160 billion euros, half of which will be funded by the French national government and half by local governments.

The German government lifted warnings advising against travel to the Turkish coastal regions of Antalya, Aydın, İzmir, and Muğla.

Irish Taoiseach Micheál Martin delayed moving the country into the fourth phase of reopening after the coronavirus pandemic by three weeks, meaning that bars, pubs and casinos will remain closed, and restrictions on the size of social gatherings will not change as planned.

The Turkish Interior Ministry announced that new inspection and enforcement rules will come into immediate effect in over 80 of the country's provinces to ensure that the public and businesses are complying with coronavirus restrictions, after a recent surge in infections. Authorities also stated that tougher restrictions may be implemented in the capital Ankara to slow the spread of there virus.

=== 5 August ===
The German Foreign Office advised against all non-essential travel to the Belgian province of Antwerp and declared the city of Antwerp to be a high-risk area, with all travellers returning to Germany required to enter a 14-day quarantine.

Health authorities in the Dutch capital of Amsterdam announced that it will be mandatory to wear a face mask in several popular outdoor areas of the city, including the De Wallen red-light district.

Data from Statistics Sweden revealed that the country's GDP contracted by 8.6 per cent in the second quarter of 2020, the largest decrease since 1980.

Health authorities in Switzerland added The Bahamas, Equatorial Guinea, Romania, São Tomé and Príncipe, Singapore and mainland Spain to a list of countries deemed to have unsafe levels of coronavirus transmission, therefore requiring all travellers returning to Switzerland from August 8 to enter a mandatory quarantine. Azerbaijan, Russia and the United Arab Emirates were removed from the list; authorities also added pregnant women to the vulnerable category and strongly advised them against extended close contact with people outside of their household.

Scottish First Minister Nicola Sturgeon reimposed several lockdown restrictions in the city of Aberdeen following a rise in infections linked to nightlife in the city, therefore, restaurants and pubs were instructed to close with immediate effect. Authorities advised against non-essential travel, with residents prohibited from visiting other households; the measures will be reviewed on 12 August and extended if deemed necessary.

=== 6 August ===
Danish Health Minister Magnus Heunicke announced that the limit on social gatherings will not be lifted following a recent surge in new infections across the country, on advice from the Statens Serum Institut.

Dutch Prime Minister Mark Rutte stated that authorities were not considering imposing a second coronavirus lockdown despite rising infection rates in several parts of the country; he also urged tourists to avoid busier areas of the capital Amsterdam, and for people to observe social distancing at all times.

Norwegian authorities advised against all non-essential travel to the Czech Republic, France, Monaco and Switzerland due to rising coronavirus cases, therefore requiring all travellers returning from those countries to Norway to enter a mandatory 10-day quarantine. Health Minister Bent Høie also announced that the same measures would apply to the Swedish counties of Skåne and Kronoberg, although the counties of Dalarna, Södermanland, Uppsala and Västerbotten would be removed from the quarantine list.

British Transport Secretary Grant Shapps announced that Andorra, the Bahamas and Belgium will be removed from the government's list of safe countries to travel to due to rising rates of infection, therefore requiring all travellers returning to the UK to self-isolate for 14 days. Shapps also announced that travellers returning from Brunei and Malaysia would no longer have to self-isolate.

First Minister of Northern Ireland Arlene Foster delayed the reopening of pubs to an 'indicative date' of 1 September and announced that face masks will be compulsory in shops from 10 August, as a result of the basic reproduction number rising above 1. Foster also confirmed that schools in Northern Ireland will fully reopen after the summer break at the start of September.

Organisers of the 2020 London Marathon announced that the event will feature only elite runners and wheelchair racers due to public health concerns. Runners who had been scheduled to participate will be able to engage in a virtual marathon instead.

=== 7 August ===
Irish Taoiseach Micheál Martin announced that County Kildare, County Laois and County Offaly will be placed into Ireland's first regional lockdown for two weeks due to surging coronavirus cases there. Under the new restrictions, residents were advised to travel for essential reasons only and work from home where possible; restaurants and cafes were instructed to close all indoor dining areas, and social gatherings were limited to fifteen people outdoors and six people indoors. Casinos, cinemas, gyms, swimming pools, theatres and sporting venues were also instructed to close.

Maltese Prime Minister Robert Abela ordered several coronavirus restrictions to be reimposed to control a surge in cases throughout the country, with face masks made mandatory in all public spaces, with fines of up to fifty euros if caught breaking the rules. Social gatherings will be limited to 100 people indoors and 300 people outdoors, with access to care homes limited.

Officials at Vnukovo International Airport in the Russian capital of Moscow introduced a COVID-19 express testing system, whereby arriving and departing travellers can pay to receive a COVID-19 test, and receive the results within an hour.

Spanish authorities placed the municipality of Aranda de Duero under new lockdown restrictions to slow the spread of coronavirus. Residents will be prevented from leaving the area and non-residents will be barred from entering.

Swiss authorities reached an agreement with the American biotechnology company Moderna to secure 4.5 million doses of the company's potential COVID-19 vaccine.

British authorities imposed several lockdown restrictions on the city of Preston after a surge in the rate of infection there; under the restrictions, people from different households will not be allowed to meet indoors or in private gardens.

=== 8 August ===
Authorities in the French capital of Paris announced that face masks will be mandatory in popular tourist destinations including along the River Seine, the Canal Saint-Martin, the Montmartre and outdoor markets from 10 August for a month due to rising coronavirus cases in the country.

The German Foreign Office added the Bulgarian provinces of Blagoevgrad, Dobrich, Varna and the Romanian counties of Argeș, Bihor, Buzău, Neamț, Ialomița, Mehedinți and Timiș to a list of places deemed to have unsafe levels of coronavirus transmission, thus requiring all returning travellers to undergo a mandatory COVID-19 test.

Italian Prime Minister Giuseppe Conte revealed a 25 billion euro economic stimulus package. Under the package, greater tax benefits will be granted to the poorer southern regions, cruise holidays will be resumed from 15 August, emergency monthly payments to vulnerable families will be extended, and 500 million euros will be allocated to overtime payments for healthcare workers.

The Ukrainian government closed the border with the disputed territory of Crimea for three weeks to attempt to prevent the spread of coronavirus; only residents of Crimea who have Ukrainian citizenship will be permitted to enter the peninsula.

=== 9 August ===
British Prime Minister Boris Johnson stated that the reopening of schools in England after the summer break in September is a "moral duty" and a "national priority", due to the impact of the COVID-19 pandemic on education, and insisted that it is safe to reopen the country's schools.

=== 11 August ===
Germany's Federal Foreign Office extended warnings advising against all non-essential travel to the Spanish autonomous communities of Madrid and the Basque Country due to rising numbers of new daily infections, thus requiring all returning travellers to quarantine for 14 days.

Russian President Vladimir Putin announced that a COVID-19 vaccine developed by Russian scientists at the Gamaleya Research Institute of Epidemiology and Microbiology in Moscow has received approval from the drug regulators despite clinical trials not reaching the third phase, prompting international concerns over the safety of the vaccine; authorities announced that mass vaccination could begin as early as October. The World Health Organization stated that there was 'not enough evidence' to evaluate the safety and efficacy of the vaccine, and urged the Russian government to review data from the trials to ensure the safety of patients.

Schools in Scotland began a phased reopening after being closed since March due to the coronavirus pandemic, with the first week of schooling acting as an induction week; First Minister Nicola Sturgeon stated that the aim is to have all schools fully open by 17 August.

=== 12 August ===
Authorities in the Belgian capital of Brussels announced that face masks will now be compulsory in all public places for everybody above the age of twelve, with increased police checks to ensure the public comply with the new measures.

The German Federal Foreign Office added eleven regions of Romania, including the capital Bucharest to a list of areas deemed to have unsafe levels of coronavirus transmission, thus requiring all returning travellers to enter a 14-day quarantine. In response, German Labour Minister Hubertus Heil cancelled a planned visit later in the week to meet the Romanian Prime Minister Ludovic Orban and several other cabinet ministers.

Italian Minister of Health Roberto Speranza announced that travellers arriving into the country from Croatia, Greece, Malta and Spain will be required to receive a COVID-19 test following a surge in cases; Colombia was also added to a list of countries to which all travel is prohibited.

Norwegian Prime Minister Erna Solberg announced that, from 15 August, all travellers returning from Cyprus, the Faros Islands, Iceland, Malta, the Netherlands and Poland, as well as several regions of Denmark and Sweden, will be required to undergo a 10-day quarantine. Solberg also stated that Norwegian citizens should avoid non-essential international travel as much as possible.

Authorities in Uzbekistan announced that an easing of coronavirus lockdown restrictions will take place on 15 August following declining infection rates. Under the new measures, non-essential businesses including hotels and hair salons will be permitted to reopen, and domestic air and rail travel will resume; people will also be allowed to leave their homes for non-essential reasons.

=== 21 August ===
Irish Agriculture Minister Dara Calleary resigned after attending a social event with the country's golf society, which may have breached Ireland's COVID-19 restrictions.

== Reactions and measures in South and Southeast Asia ==
=== 1 August ===
A decision by the Malaysian Government requiring people to wear face masks in public spaces and public transportation comes into effect. Under the Prevention and Control of Infectious Diseases Act, violators face a fine of up to RM1,000 (S$324).

The Singaporean Immigration and Checkpoints Authority requires Malaysia citizens and permanent residents with Singapore work passes to serve a stay-home notice for at least seven days and undergo a COVID-19 swab test.

=== 2 August ===
Indian Home Affairs Minister Amit Shah tested positive for COVID-19, and subsequently urged everybody who had been in close contact with him to self-isolate at home.

=== 3 August ===
The Shri Ram Janmabhoomi Teerth Kshetra, the trust established to manage the construction of the Ram Mandir temple in Ayodhya, stated that preparations were still going ahead for Indian Prime Minister Narendra Modi's visit to the site on 5 August, despite the escalating coronavirus situation in the country.

Indian biopharmaceutical company Wockhardt announced that it had reached an agreement with the British government to supply millions of doses of several different COVID-19 vaccines; the company also revealed that it has reserved the final stage of manufacturing of the vaccines as part of the agreement. Manufacturing will be carried out at the site of CP Pharmaceuticals, a subsidiary company of Wockhardt, in Wrexham.

=== 4 August ===
Indian health authorities announced that phase two clinical trials have begun of two different potential COVID-19 vaccines, developed by biotechnology company Bharat Biotech and pharmaceutical company Cadila Healthcare respectively.

=== 6 August ===
Researchers at Padjadjaran University in the Indonesian city of Bandung announced that the first human trials of a potential COVID-19 vaccine involving over 1,500 volunteers will begin on 11 August, developed jointly by Chinese biopharmaceutical company Sinovac Biotech and Indonesian vaccine manufacturer Bio Farma.

Pakistani Planning Minister Asad Umar announced that several coronavirus restrictions will be eased following a decrease in the number of new infections. Restaurants, cafes, theme parks, gyms, theatres, cinemas and casinos will be permitted to reopen from 10 August, and wedding venues and schools will reopen from 15 September. Restrictions on public transport will also be eased, although the number of passengers able to travel will remain restricted until October.

=== 7 August ===
The England and Wales Cricket Board announced that the tour of India by the England cricket team will be postponed to 2021 due to surging coronavirus cases in the country, with authorities reporting more than 2 million total cases so far.

A court in the Indian city of Mumbai ruled that actors and crew over the age of 65 will be permitted to resume production of Bollywood films.

=== 9 August ===
The Indian Medical Association urged Prime Minister Narendra Modi to provide adequate care for healthcare workers and their families after almost 200 doctors were reported to have died from COVID-19.

The North Korean Government delivered aid packages comprising food and medical equipment to the city of Kaesong, close to the South Korean border after a state of emergency was imposed in July due to concerns over a possible imported case, although authorities did not confirm whether the suspected patient tested positive.

=== 10 August ===
The Red Cross Society of the Democratic People's Republic of Korea deployed over 40,000 volunteers to assist North Korean urban areas in all nine of the country's provinces, including the locked-down city of Kaesong, in preventing any outbreaks of coronavirus, as well as helping with flood relief efforts.

=== 11 August ===
Authorities in Bhutan imposed the first country-wide coronavirus lockdown after a returning traveller tested positive for COVID-19. Residents were instructed to only leave their homes for strictly essential reasons, and schools and offices were ordered to close.

=== 16 August ===
Malaysian Director-General of Health Noor Hisham Abdullah has confirmed that the Malaysian Institute for Medical Research had detected the D614G type mutation after testing three cases from the Sivagangga Cluster and one case from the Ulu Tiram Cluster. This mutation is now the dominant form of the COVID-19 virus in the pandemic.

=== 27 August ===
LG launches a battery powered face mask with a fan and replaceable filters to address discomfort and difficulty breathing commonly reported by face mask users.

=== 28 August ===
Malaysian Prime Minister Muhyiddin Yassin has announced that the country's Recovery Movement Control Order restrictions would be extended until 31 December 2020.

== Reactions and measures in the Western Pacific ==
=== 1 August ===
Governor of Okinawa Prefecture in Japan, Denny Tamaki, declared a state of emergency in all of Okinawa following surges in daily coronavirus infections and authorities warning that healthcare facilities could potentially be overwhelmed. Residents were urged to avoid non-essential travel for two weeks, although the measures are not enforceable by law.

South Korean authorities arrested Lee Man-hee, the leader of the Shincheonji Church of Jesus on charges of obstructing the government's efforts to contain the COVID-19 pandemic in February and March 2020.

Authorities in the Vietnamese city of Da Nang revealed plans to provide COVID-19 tests for all of the city's 1.1 million residents after a recent outbreak of domestically transmitted infections there, with the testing capacity scheduled to be increased to up to 10,000 a day.

=== 2 August ===
In Australia, Premier of Victoria Daniel Andrews announced that the state of Victoria will enter into a state of emergency from 6 pm Sunday local time after 671 new cases were reported that day. Melbourne will enter into "stage four" lockdown restrictions on travel and businesses, with only one person per household allowed out to go shopping each day, with schools asked to hold lessons remotely. Regional areas will move into "stage three restrictions" with cafes and restaurants being allowed to provide takeaway services.

China's National Health Commission dispatched a team of officials to Hong Kong, experiencing a third wave of infections, to conduct mass COVID-19 testing.

President of the Philippines Rodrigo Duterte announced that the coronavirus lockdown in the Greater Manila Area will be significantly tightened from 4 August following surging coronavirus infections. The lockdown in the area was upgraded to a "Modified Enhanced Community Quarantine" until at least 18 August; under the new restrictions, residents will be forced to only travel for essential reasons, with all public transport being suspended, and hairdressers, beauty salons and gyms will all close, although shopping centres and restaurants can remain open at reduced capacities.

=== 3 August ===
On 3 August, Victorian Premier Daniel Andrews announced that supermarkets, grocery stores, pharmacies, petrol stations, banks, news agencies, post offices, and other businesses involved in the state's pandemic response would be allowed to remain open, although the retail sector and some manufacturing and administrative companies will be closed from midnight on 5 August. The meat processing and construction industries would be allowed to operate with reduced personnel.

The Singaporean Immigration and Checkpoints Authority announced that all travellers arriving or returning to the country from 11 August will be required to wear an electronic monitoring device to ensure that they comply with coronavirus regulations, with attempts to leave the mandatory two week quarantine or alter the device's settings alerting authorities.

=== 4 August ===
Victorian Premier Daniel Andrews announced that those who are self-isolating will only be allowed to exercise within their own properties. Australian Defence Force and Victorian Department of Health and Human Services officers would also be visiting homes to ensure that people are complying with self-isolation orders, with anyone breaching the orders possibly fined up to 20,000 Australian dollars.

Australian authorities extended the closure of the Uluṟu-Kata Tjuṯa National Park due to concerns from the indigenous population that visitors could potentially spread the coronavirus to the area, with the indigenous community believed to be at a considerably higher risk of developing severe symptoms.

Stay-at-home orders were issued on the Philippine island of Luzon, including in the capital city of Manila, following a surge in coronavirus infections, effectively placing thirty million people back into lockdown. The order will be in effect for two weeks, with residents only permitted to leave their homes for strictly essential reasons; restaurants were instructed to close all indoor dining areas, and all public transport on the island was suspended.

The Taiwan Centers for Disease Control provisionally approved the use of dexamethasone to treat COVID-19 patients due to global shortages of the remdesivir drug.

=== 5 August ===
Premier of the Australian state of Queensland Annastacia Palaszczuk announced that the borders with New South Wales and the Australian Capital Territory will be closed from 8 August to attempt to prevent the spread of coronavirus.

In China, human trials of a potential COVID-19 vaccine, developed jointly by German company BioNTech and Chinese company Fosun Pharmaceutical, began with over seventy participants.

Statistics Indonesia revealed that the Indonesian GDP contracted by 5.3 per cent in the second quarter of 2020, the largest decline since the 1997 Asian financial crisis.

=== 6 August ===
The Australian city of Melbourne entered a six-week coronavirus lockdown to attempt to slow the rapidly increasing spread of the virus. Under the new restrictions, all non-essential businesses were closed and residents were instructed to stay at home unless travel is strictly essential.

Japanese automobile manufacturer Toyota reported a profit of 13.9 billion yen for the first fiscal quarter of 2020, down 98 per cent, which was attributed to the impact of the coronavirus pandemic.

Managers at the Ok Tedi Mine in Papua New Guinea announced that the company would suspend operations for at least two weeks after a number of cases were reported amongst employees.

The Philippine Statistics Authority revealed data that shows how the country's gross domestic product growth rate decreased by 16.5 per cent in the second quarter of 2020, the biggest contraction since records began in 1981. This officially placed the Philippine economy into recession, the first time the economy has been in recession in over thirty years.

=== 7 August ===
Chief Executive of Hong Kong Carrie Lam announced that all residents of Hong Kong will be able to access free COVID-19 tests if they wish, with Lam stating that the scheme will likely be in operation within two weeks.

=== 8 August ===
The Australian state of Queensland's closure of its border with New South Wales came into force at 1 am local time. Most visitors from New South Wales will be denied entry apart from rare exceptions. Queenslanders returning to the state will have to pay for 14 days in mandatory hotel quarantine.

=== 10 August ===
Australian Prime Minister Scott Morrison stated that internal border closures imposed around the country were not likely to be lifted before the end of the year.

Mayor of the Philippine capital of Manila, Isko Moreno, announced that authorities will distribute one million face masks to residents to attempt to slow the spread of coronavirus in the city; it was also revealed that the city government had allocated 200 million pesos to secure doses of potential COVID-19 vaccines.

=== 11 August ===
New Zealand Prime Minister Jacinda Ardern has announced that Auckland will be moving into an Alert Level 3 lockdown after the discovery of four new cases of community transmission in that city from Wednesday afternoon to Friday midnight. Under Alert Level 3, people apart from essential workers will be encouraged to work from home while most schools, public facilities, bars, restaurants, and businesses must close by tomorrow. The rest of the country will be moving to an Alert Level 2 lockdown from Wednesday afternoon to Friday midnight.

Prime Minister of Papua New Guinea James Marape announced plans to ease the country's coronavirus lockdown despite surging cases; it was later revealed that the lockdown imposed on the capital of Port Moresby for the past two weeks will be lifted on 12 August.

President of the Philippines Rodrigo Duterte praised the efforts of the developers of Russia's approved COVID-19 vaccine and stated that the country would be willing to collaborate with Russian researchers on further trials of the vaccine.

=== 12 August ===
Hong Kong's national flag carrier Cathay Pacific reported a loss of 9.9 billion Hong Kong dollars (equivalent to almost $1.3 billion) during the first half of 2020 as a direct result of international restrictions imposed to control the coronavirus pandemic.

In New Zealand, all rest homes went into a full lockdown in response to the discovery of four community transmissions in Auckland. In addition, it was announced that all passengers travelling to and from Auckland will be required to wear face masks, and social distancing has been reintroduced at several airports across the country.

=== 13 August ===
The Cook Islands has closed its air border to all travellers effective midnight local time. The order is expected to be reviewed on 17 August, prior to the next scheduled flight from Auckland on 21 August.

=== 14 August ===
The opening day of schools for the new school year in the Philippines has been pushed from 24 August to 5 October due to the response of coronavirus lockdown measures in the Greater Manila Area.

New Zealand Prime Minister Jacinda Ardern has announced that current lockdown restrictions in New Zealand will be extended by 12 days until 11:59 pm local time on 26 August. The Auckland Region will remain on Alert Level 3 while the rest of the country would remain on Level 2 for that period. In addition, Ardern announced that the country's wage subsidy scheme would be extended to protect businesses and jobs in response to the new outbreaks.

=== 16 August ===
New Zealand Health Minister Chris Hipkins has criticised people for using social media to spread personal attacks on the family at the centre of the recent community transmissions and conspiracy theories around COVID-19.

=== 17 August ===
New Zealand Prime Minister Jacinda Ardern has moved the country's general election from 19 September to 17 October 2020 in response to a resurgence in community transmissions. In addition, the New Zealand Parliament's dissolution was delayed until 6 September.

=== 20 August ===
New Zealand Health Minister Chris Hipkins has rebuffed rumors within the Māori and Pacific Islander communities that the Ministry for Children (Oranga Tamariki) was taking away children whose relatives had tested positive for COVID-19.

=== 24 August ===
New Zealand Prime Minister Jacinda Ardern has announced that Auckland would remain under a Level 3 lockdown until 11:59 pm on 30 August, when the city and the Auckland Region would move to a Level 2 lockdown. The rest of New Zealand will remain on a Level 2 lockdown until 6 September. From 30 August onwards, it will be compulsory for all people using public transportation to wear face masks.

=== 26 August ===
New Zealand Health Minister Chris Hipkins has announced that it will be compulsory for all public transport providers including buses, trains, ferries, ride-share vehicles and train operators to provide Covid Tracer QR codes from 11:59 pm on 3 September.

=== 27 August ===
New Zealand Health Minister Chris Hipkins has announced that it would be compulsory for everyone over the age of 12 to wear face masks on trains and planes from 31 August. However, exemptions will be granted for health, disability, and practicality reasons. Violators face an NZ$300 infringe notice or a fine of NZ$1,000.

=== 30 August ===
New Zealand Prime Minister Jacinda Ardern confirmed that the country's largest city Auckland would enter into "Alert Level 2.5" from 11:59pm on Sunday night while the rest of the country would remain on Level 2. Under Level 2.5, all social gatherings will be limited to ten people; masks will be mandatory for all Aucklanders using public transportation; and aged care facilities will be operating under strict conditions.

== See also ==
- Timeline of the COVID-19 pandemic
