= Fatim =

Fatim is a female given name. Notable people with the name include:

- Fatim Badjie (born 1983), Gambian entrepreneur
- Fatim Diarra (born 1986), Finnish politician
- Fatim Jawara (1997–2016), Gambian footballer
- Fatim-Zahra Ammor (born 1967), Moroccan engineer

== See also ==
- FATIM (Forces Armées Tchadiennes d'Intervention au Mali), a 2013 deployment by the Chadian army
- Fatima (given name), includes spelling variations
