= Baboucarr =

Baboucarr is a Gambian masculine given name. Notable people with the name include:

- Baboucarr Gaye (born 1998), Gambian football goalkeeper
- Baboucarr Njie (born 1995), Gambian footballer
- Baboucarr-Blaise Jagne (born 1955), foreign minister of the Gambia
