= Famara Jatta =

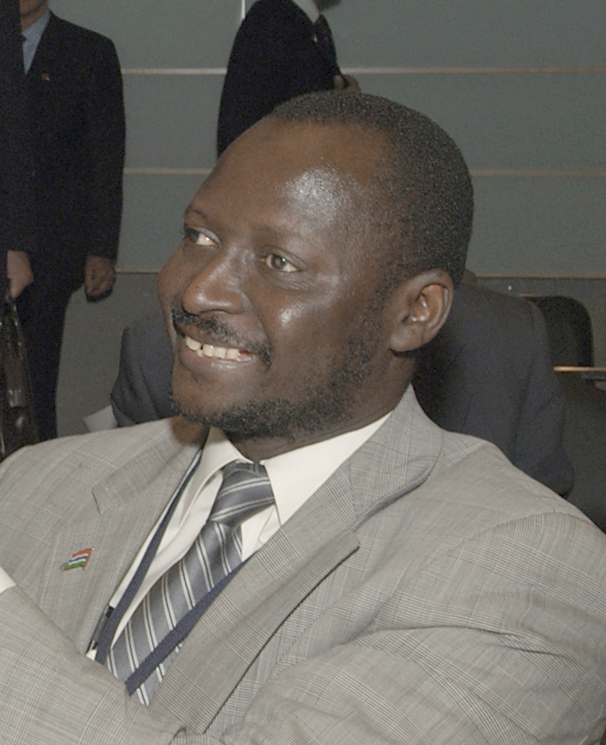
- Jatta in September 2002

Secretary of State for Trade
- In office 1997–1998

Secretary of State for Finance and Economic Affairs
- In office 1998–2003
- Preceded by: Bala Garba Jahumpa
- Succeeded by: Musa Gibril Bala Gaye

Personal details
- Born: 16 July 1958 British Gambia (now The Gambia)
- Died: March 17, 2012 (aged 53) Tunis, Tunisia

Famara L. Jatta (July 16, 1958 – March 17, 2012) was a Gambian government minister and economist. He was the Gambia's Secretary of State for Trade from 1997 to 1998, and Secretary of State for Finance and Economic Affairs from 1998 to 2003. From 2003 to 2007 he was Governor of the Central Bank of the Gambia.
