= Neneh =

Neneh is a feminine given name. Notable people with the name include:

- Neneh Cherry, Swedish singer
- Neneh MacDouall-Gaye, Gambian politician and diplomat

== See also ==
- Neneh Superstar, 2022 French comedy drama film
