= Abdou Kolley =

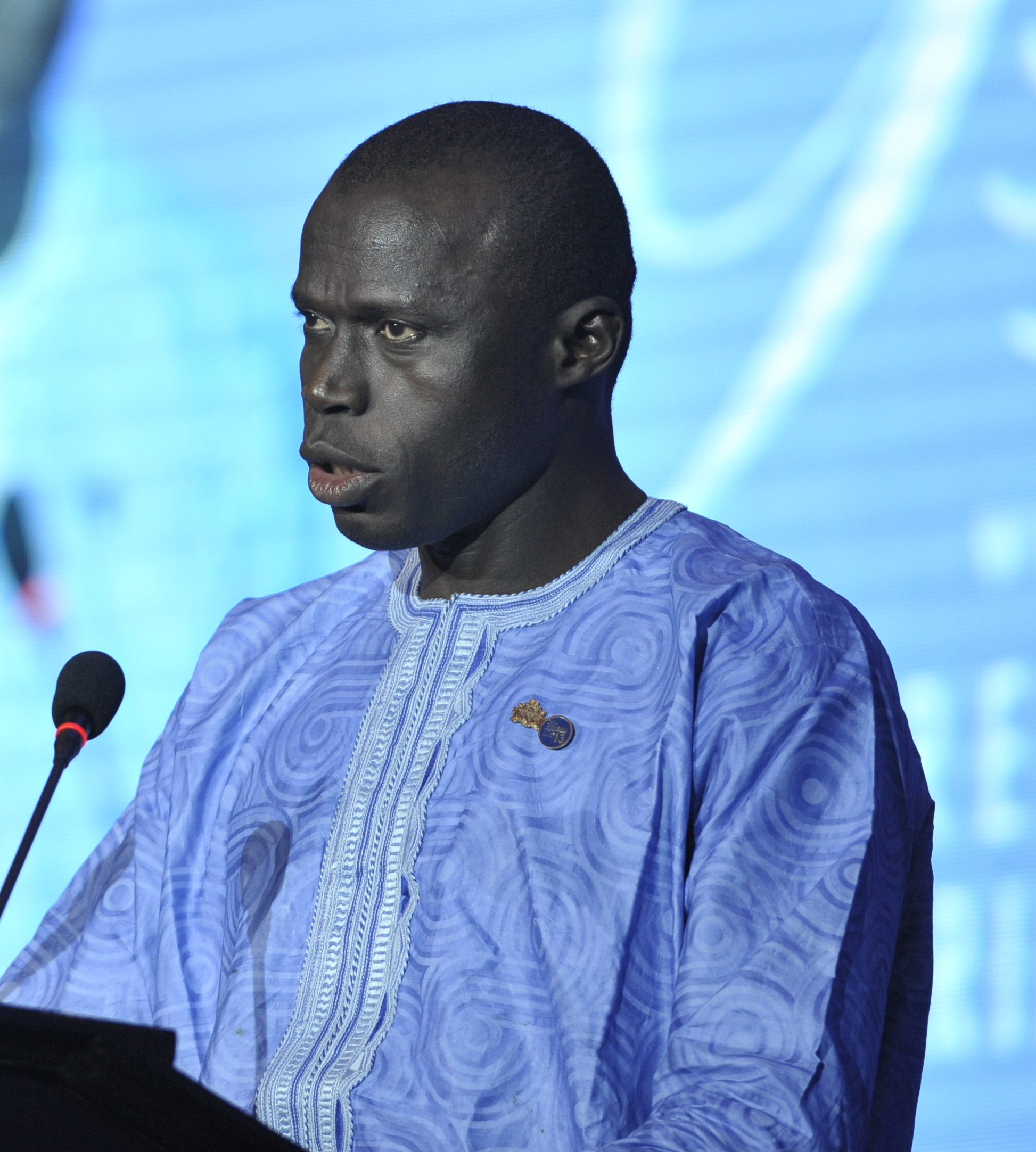
- Abdou Kolley at a World Trade Organization conference in Bali, December 2013

Minister of Finance and Economic Affairs
- In office 16 March 2015 – 17 January 2017
- President: Yahya Jammeh
- Preceded by: Kebba S. Touray
- Succeeded by: Amadou Sanneh
- In office 16 April 2012 – 10 July 2013
- Preceded by: Mambury Njie
- In office 21 July 2010 – 27 January 2011
- Succeeded by: Mambury Njie
- In office June 2009 – March 2010
- Preceded by: Musa Gibril Bala Gaye

Minister of Trade, Industry, Regional Integration and Employment Minister of Trade, Industry and Employment (2007-2009)
- In office 10 July 2013 – 11 June 2014
- President: Yahya Jammeh
- Succeeded by: Kebba S. Touray (acting)
- In office 27 January 2011 – 18 March 2011
- Succeeded by: Abdul Salam Secka
- In office March 2010 – July 2010
- In office February 2007 – June 2009

Minister of Fisheries and Water Resources
- In office 6 February 2012 – 16 April 2012
- President: Yahya Jammeh

Personal details
- Born: January 1, 1970 (age 56) Kembujeh, The Gambia
- Education: Jean Monnet University

Abdou Kolley (born 1 January 1970) is a Gambian economist and politician who was Gambian Minister of Finance and Economic Affairs. He has held several roles in the Cabinet of the Gambia, having previously served as Minister of Finance and Economic Affairs and Minister of Trade, Industry, Regional Integration and Employment several times, as well as Minister of Fisheries and Water Resources.

== Early life and education ==
Kolley attended both St. Peter's Lower and Upper Basic School, Lamin, and St. Augustine's Senior Secondary School, Banjul, where he received his O Levels and A Levels respectively.

He then continued his education in France, where he completed an Advanced French Diploma at the Jean Monnet University in 1992. He continued his studies at Jean Monnet, completing a Diploma of General University Studies, majoring in economics, in 1995. He received his bachelor's degree in economics in 1996 and his master's degree in economics in 1997, both at Jean Monnet University.

== Career ==
From 1997 to 2000, Kolley worked in the Gambian civil service as an economist at the Ministry of Finance and Economic Affairs. During his time at the Ministry, he coordinated Gambia through the initial stage of the World Bank's Capacity Building for Economic Management Project. He also contributed to the foundation of the Gambia Divestiture Agency and the Gambia Public Utilities Regulatory Authority (PURA).

Moving on from the Ministry in 2000, Kolley worked at the Gambia Divestiture Agency that he had helped found. He firstly worked as a senior economist, then principal economist, and then director of the agency. In November 2004, he left the Gambia Divestiture Agency and began working as an economic analyst in the Strategy Policy Unit of the United Nations Development Programme (UNDP) in the Gambia.

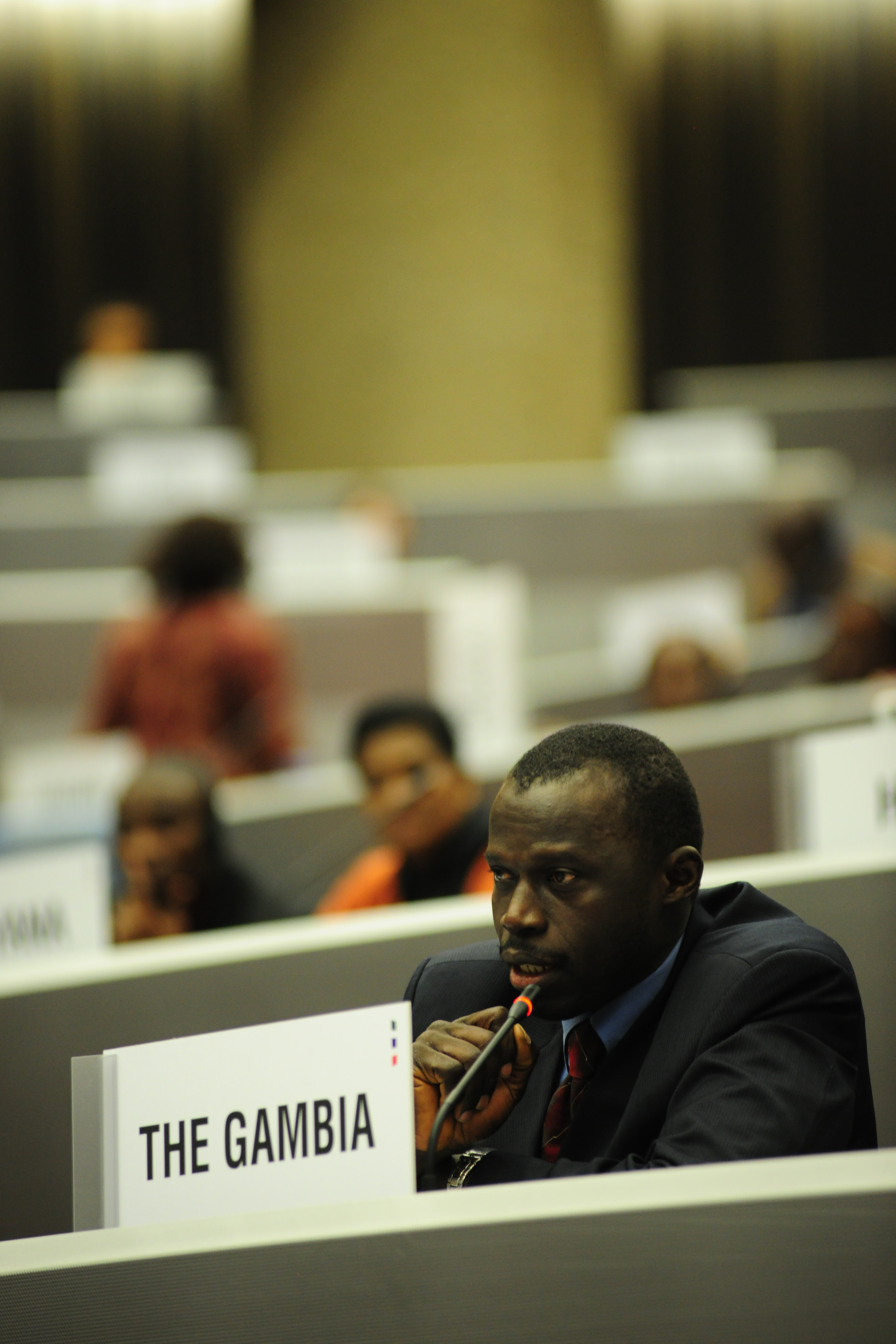
Kolley at the 8th World Trade Organization Ministerial Conference in 2011.

In February 2007, Kolley left the UNDP and was appointed as the Minister of Trade, Industry and Employment. As a Minister, he was a member of the National Planning Commission and the National Nutrition Council. He was also the Minister responsible for matters relating to the Economic Community of West African States (ECOWAS). From March 2007 to June 2008, he served as the Gambia's governor of the ECOWAS Bank for Investment and Development (EBID), helping complete the bank's restructuring process before handing over responsibility to the Minister of Finance. He also served as a member of the ECOWAS Council of Ministers and the Ministerial Monitoring Committee responsible for overseeing the development of an Economic Partnership Agreement (EPA) between ECOWAS and the European Union.

In June 2009, Kolley was appointed Minister of Finance and Economic Affairs. In this role, he continued as a member of the National Planning Commission, and also served as the Chairman of the Governing Council of the West African Insurance Institute and of the Africa Constituency Group I in the World Bank and the IMF. He also served as the Gambian governor of EBID, the Islamic Development Bank, the African Development Bank and BSIC.

In March 2010, he was reappointed the Minister of Trade, Regional Integration and Employment, with the portfolio of Industry removed. He was reappointed as Minister of Finance and Economic Affairs in July 2010, then as Minister of Trade again in January 2011. He was appointed as Minister of Fisheries and Water Resources in February 2012, and then as Ministry of Finance and Economic Affairs in April 2012. In July 2013, he was appointed as Minister of Trade, a role which he was removed from in June 2014.

In March 2015, it was reported that Kolley was to succeed Seedy Lette as the Gambian Ambassador to South Africa. However, Kolley was re-appointed as Minister of Finance and Economic Affairs on 16 March, as the previous Minister, Kebba S. Touray, was moved to the diplomatic service.

== Awards ==
Kolley was invested as an Officer of the National Order of the Republic of the Gambia (ORD) by Yahya Jammeh. He is also a Distinguished Fellow of the New Westminster College in British Columbia, Canada.
