= Omar Sey =

Gambian politician (1941–2018)

Omar Baru Sey Ne Oumar Barou Sy (2 February 1941 – 2 March 2018) was a Gambian politician who served as the foreign minister of the Gambia from 1987 to 1994. He was dismissed from his post in 1994 following the 1994 overthrow of the government by Yahya Jammeh and the Armed Forces Provisional Ruling Council. He was one of the ministers who was not found corrupt by the Commission of Enquiry by the Jammeh regime.

Sey was one of the most educated and well respected diplomatic ministers Gambia has had. He was born in Kayes, Mali. He graduated from the University of Pennsylvania with a PhD degree in political science and continued to be one of the first African Lecturers in that University. He married Khaddijatou Jallow, an aunt of the then wife of the President of the First Republic of The Gambia, Sir Dawda Jawara.

While in the States, he had four children, Amadou, Ousainou, Modou and Isha Sey with his wife.

Upon return to the Gambia he was offered the position of Director of Youths Sports and Culture. He also worked with FIFA, C.A.F and worked side by side with Issa Hayatou the former C.A.F president as his assistant. He was later convinced by his best friend and cousin Ousainou Njai the son of the most successful businessman the Gambia had ever had to enter into politics. Ousainou Njai was then managing director of the Gambia Commercial and Development Bank and this is where most of his father's wealth was stored.

As a result, Omar Sey entered politics and became foreign minister in 1987. After 1994 Omar Sey continued his work with FIFA and did various consultancy jobs for the United Nations such as being Head of the U.N.A.M.S.I.L etc. He also worked in Kuwait and Qatar on behalf of the U.N. Before his death on March 2, 2018, in Banjul, Omar lived between the States where his children live and the Gambia. He also served as a political adviser to FIFA and to the UN.

Preceded by Lamin Kiti Jabang	Foreign Minister of the Gambia; 1987–1994	Succeeded by Bolong Sonko
