= Crispin Grey-Johnson =

Gambian political figure (born 1946)

Crispin Grey-Johnson (born 7 December 1946) is a Gambian political figure. He is the current Secretary of State for Higher Education of the Gambia.

Grey-Johnson was born in Banjul. From 1997 to 1999, he was Ambassador to the United States, Brazil, and Venezuela, and High Commissioner to Canada. He presented his credentials as Ambassador to the U.S. on September 8, 1997. He then served as High Commissioner to Sierra Leone and Ambassador to Côte d'Ivoire and Liberia from 1999 to 2002. On March 12, 2002, he became the Gambia's Permanent Representative to the United Nations, serving until 2007. During this time, he served as chairman of the United Nations Commission on Population and Development.

Grey-Johnson was appointed Secretary of State for Higher Education, Research, Science and Technology in early 2007, and he was sworn in on February 22, 2007. He was subsequently named Secretary of State for Foreign Affairs in September 2007. On March 19, 2008, he was moved to the post of Secretary of State for Higher Education.

He is married with five children as of 2002.

Preceded by Bala Garba-Jahumpa	Foreign Minister of Gambia; 2007-2008	Succeeded by Omar Touray
