= Dembo M. Badjie =

Gambian civil servant and diplomat

His Excellency Dembo M. Badjie
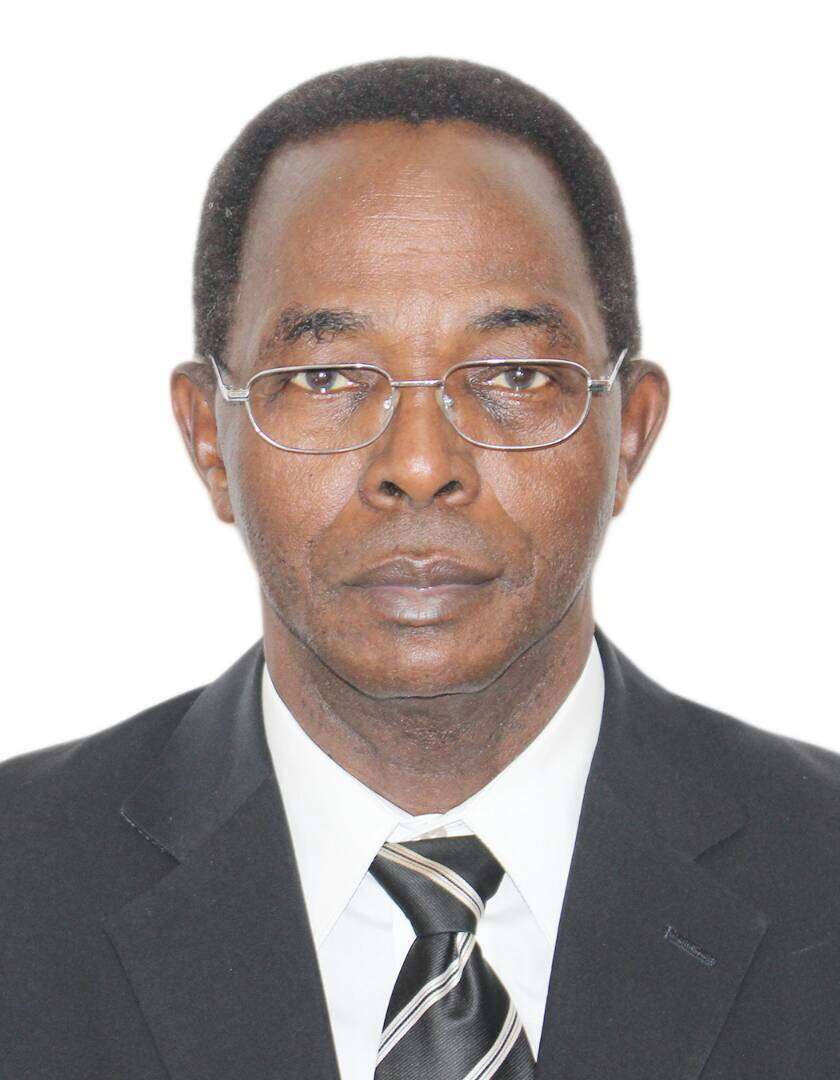

Gambian Ambassador to China
- In office 2016–2017

Gambian Ambassador to India
- In office 2010–2016

Gambian Ambassador to Sierra Leone
- In office 2004–2010

Personal details
- Born: 1952 (age 73–74) The Gambia
- Children: Fatim Badjie
- Education: Rust College (BA); Glasgow College of Technology (Diploma)

Dembo M. Badjie (born 1952) is a retired Gambian civil servant and diplomat. He entered the Gambian Government in 1970, taking a break to study Political Science and Economics at Rust College, followed by postgraduate studies at Glasgow Caledonian University. He re-entered the civil service in 1978, serving in several ministries, including local government and education. In 1983, he had a daughter, Fatim Badjie, who is also a Gambian politician.

== Career ==
He eventually joined the foreign service, serving as the first secretary of the Gambian embassy in Brussels and the Gambian mission to the United Nations. He became Ambassador to Sierra Leone in 2004.

In 2010, he was moved to be the Gambian ambassador to India (also serving Bangladesh and Myanmar), in 2010, before entering the Gambian embassy in China in 2016, after the resumption of diplomatic relations between the two countries.

In 2017, he retired and wrote a book, Outlook on Governance & Administration in The Gambia.

== The Diplomat ==
The Diplomat, a commercial and hospitality development in The Gambia, was named in his honour. The naming initiative was associated with his daughter Fatim Badjie. She sought to commemorate his long career and contribution to public service. His career has been described as spanning nearly four decades of service to The Gambia.
