= Sidi Moro Sanneh =

Gambian economist, politician and diplomat

Gambian Ambassador to Senegal
- In office November 2005 – February 2006
- President: Yahya Jammeh

Minister of Foreign Affairs
- In office 14 October 2004 – 24 March 2005
- President: Yahya Jammeh
- Preceded by: Baboucarr-Blaise Jagne
- Succeeded by: Musa Gibril Bala Gaye

Personal details
- Born: 2 December 1947 (age 78) Bathurst, The Gambia
- Education: Wilberforce University; University of Wisconsin–Madison; Massachusetts Institute of Technology

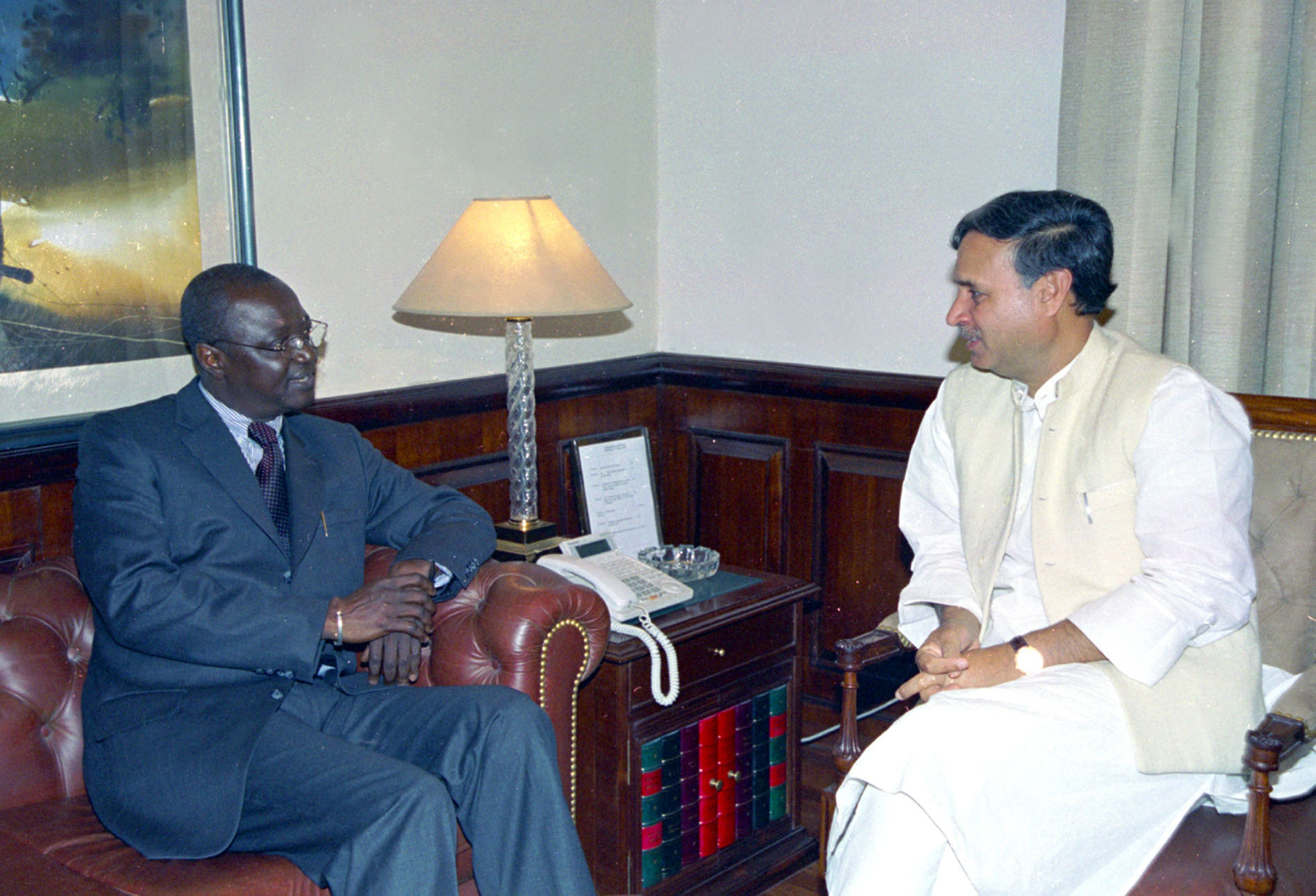
Sanneh with Shri Rap Inderjit Singh on March 9, 2005

Sidi Moro Sanneh (born 2 December 1947) is a Gambian economist, politician and diplomat and is currently a resident of the United States. Sanneh served as the Gambian Minister of Foreign Affairs from October 2004 to March 2005, and as the Gambian Ambassador to Senegal from November 2005 to February 2006.

== Early life and education ==
Sanneh was born on 2 December 1947 in Bathurst, the only child of Morro Sanneh, a police inspector, and Aji Mallen Gaye. He was one of the first students to go through Gambia High School, beginning his studies there in 1959.

He attended university in the United States, completing a bachelor's degree in economics and political science at Wilberforce University, Ohio. He then completed a master's degree in agricultural economics at the University of Wisconsin–Madison before completing a diploma in urban management at the Massachusetts Institute of Technology. As a student, Sanneh campaigned for Robert F. Kennedy in his bid to become the Democratic nominee in the 1968 US presidential election.

== Career ==
Sanneh worked as an assistant to the Mayor of Madison, Wisconsin, before working as the city's Public Service Employment Administrator and later the Coordinator of the Community Development Block Grant for both the city of Madison and Dane County.

He returned to the Gambia in 1977, following the death of his father, when he joined the Gambian civil service. His first role was in the Ministry of Economic Planning and Industrial Development (MEPID), working under Dr Jabez Langley. From MEPID, he was seconded for three years to the Ministry of Agriculture to return the scandal-ridden Rural Development Project (RDP) to credibility. Following this, he returned to MEPID before transferring to the Ministry of Education.

At the Ministry of Education he ran a project of investment into the education sector that culminated into what is now the University of the Gambia. In 1989, he was asked to move again, this time to the Ministry of Finance and Trade where he worked as a Deputy Permanent Secretary. In January 1992, he left government service to work as an Executive Director of the African Development Bank Group in Abidjan. He left the Bank in June 2001 when he became a senior advisor on Resource Mobilisation with the United Nations Development Programme's (UNDP) Regional Bureau for Africa.

He became the Gambian Minister of Foreign Affairs on 14 October 2004 and served in that position until 24 March 2005, when he was removed without explanation. When relations between the Gambia and Senegal turned sour later that year, Jammeh asked him to return but as the Gambian Ambassador to Senegal. He took this role on in November 2005, with concurrent accreditation for Burkina Faso and Mali, and presented his credentials to the Senegalese government in January 2006. One of the most pressing issues he had to deal with were negotiations over the Casamance conflict.

In early February 2006, Sanneh received a call from a prominent Gambian parliamentarian and Jammeh appointee, warning him that Jammeh suspected him of working with the Gambian opposition. On 16 February, Sanneh received a call notifying that he had been relieved of his duty as an ambassador, but Sanneh insisted on a formal written notification. In March, a Gambian National Intelligence Agency (NIA) agent brought Sanneh the written notification, and informed him that he was to bring him back to Banjul, but Sanneh refused to leave. The Gambian government then granted him permission to remain in the embassy residence until his daughter's school year had ended.

Following the end of his daughter's school year, Sanneh and his family moved to a hotel in Dakar. At the hotel, Sanneh and his family received threatening anonymous phone calls and noticed a large number of Gambian cars around the hotel and a large number of Gambians working in and staying in the hotel, causing them to fear for their lives. In August 2006, the US Embassy in Dakar requested authorization for Sanneh and his family to be taken in under the US Refugee Resettlement Program, writing that they considered "their lives to be in immediate danger".

In January 2007, Sanneh returned to the United States, and in January 2008, he was made program Director at Dyncorp International in Falls Church, Virginia. He currently blogs about the Gambian government and is considered a "dissident".

Preceded by Baboucarr-Blaise Jagne	Minister of Foreign Affairs; 2004–2005	Succeeded by Musa Gibril Bala Gaye
