= Serign Modou Njie =

Marie-Édith Tassyla-Ye-Doumbeneny

Minister of Foreign Affairs
- Incumbent
- Assumed office 14 July 2025
- President: Adama Barrow
- Preceded by: Mamadou Tangara

Personal details
- Born: 14 April 1970 (age 56) Medina Sergne Mass, Lower Niumi, North Bank Region
- Party: Independent

Serign Modou Njie MRG, sometimes also spelled Serigne Modou Njie, (born 14 April 1970) is a Gambian general, diplomat and politician.

== Life ==
Effective 11 March 2010, Brigadier General Serign Modou Njie was appointed Chief of Staff of the Army by President Yahya Jammeh.

Njie was appointed by President Adama Barrow in mid-2021 as the fifth Gambian ambassador to Turkey, replacing Landing Kinteh. Prior to his appointment as ambassador, Njie was deputy ambassador to Turkey. On 23 June 2021, he presented his credentials to Recep Tayyip Erdoğan.

With the formation of the new cabinet on 4 May 2022, Barrow appointed Njie as Minister of Defence, replacing Sheikh Omar Fye. After the previous Foreign Minister, Mamadou Tangara, resigned from his post on 3 July 2025, Njie was appointed by Barrow as the new Foreign Minister of The Gambia on 9 July 2025. Vice President Muhammed B.S. Jallow was given responsibility for overseeing the Ministry of Defence.

== Honors and awards ==
- 2009: Member of the Order of the Republic of The Gambia (MRG)
