= Minister of Foreign Affairs (The Gambia) =

Gambian government ministry responsible for foreign affairs

Minister of Foreign Affairs of the Gambia
- Coat of arms of the Gambia
- Incumbent; Serign Modou Njie since 14 July 2025
- Appointer: President of the Gambia
- Term length: Not fixed
- Inaugural holder: Alieu Badara Njie
- Formation: 18 February 1965

The Minister of Foreign Affairs, International Cooperation and Gambians Abroad, commonly known as just the Minister of Foreign Affairs, is a cabinet position in the Gambia, appointed by the President of the Gambia. The minister oversees the Ministry of Foreign Affairs as well as the Gambia's external relations with foreign countries. The Minister is responsible for all Gambian embassies and diplomatic missions overseas and is assisted in this task by civil servants, including a Permanent Secretary, a Deputy Permanent Secretary for Administration and Finance, a Deputy Permanent Secretary for Technical, and a Principal Assistant Secretary.

== List of ministers of foreign affairs ==
Political parties

People's Progressive Party (PPP)
Alliance for Patriotic Reorientation and Construction (APRC)
United Democratic Party (UDP)

Other factions

Independent

Name (Birth–Death)	Portrait	Term of office		Political party	President
Alieu Badara Njie (1904–1982)		1965	1967	PPP	Dawda Jawara
Sheriff Sisay (1935–1989)		1967	1968	PPP	Dawda Jawara
Assan Musa Camara (1923–2013)		1968	1974	PPP	Dawda Jawara
Alieu Badara Njie (1904–1982)		July 1974	1977	PPP	Dawda Jawara
Lamin Kiti Jabang (born 1942)		1977	1987	PPP	Dawda Jawara
Omar Sey (1941–2018)		1987	22 July 1994 (Deposed in a coup)	PPP	Dawda Jawara
Bolong Sonko (born 1950)		1994	1995	Independent	Yahya Jammeh
Baboucarr-Blaise Jagne (born 1955)		1995	1997	Independent	Yahya Jammeh
Baboucarr-Blaise Jagne (born 1955)		1995	1997	APRC	Yahya Jammeh
Omar Njie (19..–2002)		1997	1998	APRC	Yahya Jammeh
Momodou Lamin Sedat Jobe (1944–2025)		1998	2001	APRC	Yahya Jammeh
Baboucarr-Blaise Jagne (born 1955)		30 August 2001	14 October 2004	APRC	Yahya Jammeh
Sidi Moro Sanneh (born 1947)		14 October 2004	24 March 2005	APRC	Yahya Jammeh
Musa Gibril Bala Gaye (1946–2026)		24 March 2005	October 2005	APRC	Yahya Jammeh
Lamin Kaba Bajo (born 1964)		October 2005	18 October 2006	APRC	Yahya Jammeh
Maba Jobe (1964–2023)		20 October 2006	26 October 2006	APRC	Yahya Jammeh
Bala Garba Jahumpa (born 1958)		26 October 2006	September 2007	APRC	Yahya Jammeh
Crispin Grey-Johnson (born 1946)		September 2007	19 March 2008	APRC	Yahya Jammeh
Omar Touray (born 1965)		19 March 2008	September 2009	APRC	Yahya Jammeh
Ousman Jammeh (born 1953)		September 2009	June 2010	APRC	Yahya Jammeh
Mamadou Tangara (born 1965)		June 2010	16 April 2012	APRC	Yahya Jammeh
Mambury Njie (born 1962)		16 April 2012	23 August 2012	APRC	Yahya Jammeh
Mamadou Tangara (born 1965)		23 August 2012	2 November 2012	APRC	Yahya Jammeh
Susan Waffa-Ogoo (born 1960)		2 November 2012	30 October 2013	APRC	Yahya Jammeh
Aboubacar Senghore (born 1968)		1 November 2013	9 April 2014	APRC	Yahya Jammeh
Mamour Alieu Jagne (–)		9 April 2014	15 August 2014	APRC	Yahya Jammeh
Bala Garba Jahumpa (born 1958)		25 August 2014	5 January 2015	APRC	Yahya Jammeh
Neneh MacDouall-Gaye (born 1957)		5 January 2015	16 January 2017	APRC	Yahya Jammeh
Ousainou Darboe (born 1948)		1 February 2017	29 June 2018	UDP	Adama Barrow
Mamadou Tangara (born 1965)		29 June 2018	14 July 2025	Independent	Adama Barrow
Serign Modou Njie (born 1970)		14 July 2025	Incumbent	Independent	Adama Barrow
