= Neneh MacDouall-Gaye =

Gambian politician and diplomat

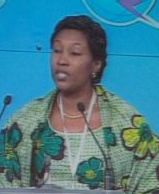
- A Gambian politician and diplomat

Minister of Foreign Affairs
- In office 5 January 2015 – 16 January 2017
- President: Yahya Jammeh
- Preceded by: Bala Garba Jahumpa
- Succeeded by: Ousainou Darboe

Gambian Ambassador to the United States
- In office 30 January 2009 – 12 August 2009
- President: Yahya Jammeh

Personal details
- Born: 8 April 1957 (age 69)

Neneh MacDouall-Gaye (born 8 April 1957) is a Gambian politician and diplomat. She served as Yahya Jammeh's last Minister of Foreign Affairs from 2015 to 2017 and as Gambian Ambassador to the United States in 2009.

== Early life and education ==
MacDouall-Gaye was born in Banjul and attended St Joseph's High School, graduating in 1974. She then received a diploma in mass communication from the Radio and Television Training Institute, part of the Maspero television building in Cairo, Egypt, in 1980.

== Political career ==
MacDouall-Gaye was initially a journalist, joining Radio Gambia in 1979. She earned many fans due to her 'golden voice'.

MacDouall-Gaye was appointed Secretary of State for Trade, Industry and Employment in 2005, a position she held for just a few months. She was then appointed the Secretary of State for Communication and Information Technology, serving until 19 March 2008, when she was replaced by Fatim Badjie. It was announced that she would become the Gambia's Permanent Representative to the United Nations, but instead, Susan Waffa-Ogoo was appointed to the role.

MacDouall-Gaye was appointed Managing Director of the Observer Company Ltd, the publishers of The Daily Observer, on 19 June 2008. She replaced Dida Halake, who was at the time held in detention at Kotu police station. MacDouall-Gaye held that role until her appointment as Gambian Ambassador to the United States on 30 January 2009. At the same time, Musa Mboob, former Inspector General of Police, was appointed Deputy Ambassador to the United States. Her position as Ambassador was terminated on 12 August 2009.

On 5 January 2015, MacDouall-Gaye was appointed Minister of Foreign Affairs, replacing Bala Garba Jahumpa. On 16 January 2017, during the 2016–2017 Gambian constitutional crisis, MacDouall-Gaye issued her letter of resignation to President of the Gambia Yahya Jammeh.

== See also ==
- List of foreign ministers in 2017

Political offices
Preceded by Bala Garba Jahumpa	Foreign Minister of the Gambia; 5 January 2015 – 16 January 2017	Succeeded by Ousainou Darboe
