= Maba Jobe =

Gambian politician (1965–2023)

Maba Jahou Jobe (1 July 1965 – 12 July 2023) was a Gambian politician.

== Biography ==
Maba Jahou Jobe was born in 1964, in Bakau, where he was also raised.

Jobe once served as an officer major and commander of the Gambian National Army until his appointment as assistant high commissioner to The Gambian embassy in the UK. Jobe was high commissioner to Nigeria from 1996 to 2001.

In a surprise move, President Yahya Jammeh dissolved the Gambian cabinet on 18 October 2006. Jobe was appointed foreign minister for the new cabinet on 20 October, replacing Lamin Kaba Bajo. Jammeh, however announced in a news broadcast on 25 October that he decided to revoke Jobe's ministership.

Maba Jobe died on 12 July 2023.

Preceded by Lamin Kaba Bajo	Foreign Minister of Gambia; 2006	Succeeded by Bala Garba Jahumpa
