= World Trade Organization Ministerial Conference of 2009 =

WTO trade conference in Geneva, Switzerland

Seventh Ministerial Conference of the World Trade Organization
- Date: Opening ceremony (30 November 2009) / Closing ceremony (3 December 2009)
- Country: Geneva, Switzerland
- Previous event: Sixth Ministerial Conference of the World Trade Organization
- Next event: Eighth Ministerial Conference of the World Trade Organization

The WTO General Council, on 26 May 2009, agreed to hold a seventh WTO ministerial conference session in Geneva from 30 November - 3 December 2009. A statement by chairman Amb. Mario Matus acknowledged that the prime purpose was to remedy a breach of protocol requiring two-yearly "regular" meetings, which had lapsed with the Doha Round failure in 2005, and that the "scaled-down" meeting would not be a negotiating session, but "emphasis will be on transparency and open discussion rather than on small group processes and informal negotiating structures". The general theme for discussion is "The WTO, the Multilateral Trading System and the Current Global Economic Environment".
