= Mamadou Tangara =

Gambian diplomat and politician

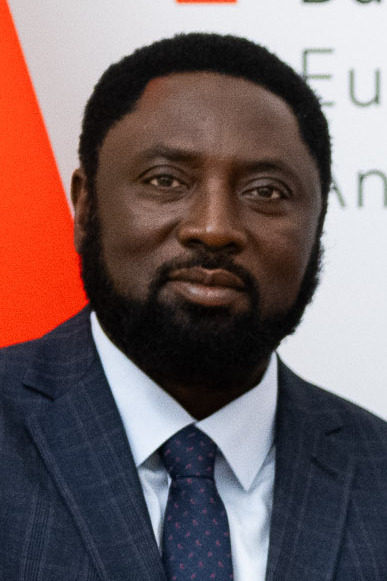

Minister of Foreign Affairs
- In office 29 June 2018 – 3 July 2025
- President: Adama Barrow
- Preceded by: Ousainou Darboe
- Succeeded by: Serign Modou Njie
- In office 23 August 2012 – 2 November 2012
- President: Yahya Jammeh
- Preceded by: Mambury Njie
- Succeeded by: Susan Waffa-Ogoo
- In office June 2010 – 16 April 2012
- President: Yahya Jammeh
- Preceded by: Ousman Jammeh
- Succeeded by: Mambury Njie

Permanent Representative of the Gambia to the United Nations
- In office 3 May 2017 – 29 June 2018
- President: Adama Barrow
- In office 13 September 2013 – 16 December 2016
- President: Yahya Jammeh
- Succeeded by: Samsudeen Sarr (acting)

Personal details
- Born: 4 June 1965 (age 61) Banjul, The Gambia
- Education: University of Limoges; UCLouvain

Mamadou Tangara (born 4 June 1965) is a Gambian diplomat and politician who served as Minister of Foreign Affairs from 2018 to 2025, having previously served in 2012 and from 2010–2012. Tangara also served as Gambian Permanent Representative to the United Nations from 2017–2018 and from 2013–2016.

== Early life and education ==
Tangara was born in Banjul in 1965. He completed two master's degrees, at the University of Limoges in France and the University of Louvain (UCLouvain) in Belgium. He went on to complete a PhD in social sciences from the University of Limoges also.

== Early career ==
Tangara was editor-in-chief of La Lune, a magazine published in French aimed at French learners. From 2002, he worked as a lecturer at the University of the Gambia, and then as president and chairman of the University Governing Council.

== Political career ==
From 2008 to 2010, he was coordinator of the National Authorizing Office Support Unit for EU-funded programmes and projects in the Gambia. He then became an advisor to president Yahya Jammeh regarding UNESCO.

He was appointed Minister of Foreign Affairs by Jammeh in June 2010. He held the role until April 2012, when he was appointed Minister for Fisheries, Water Resources and National Assembly Matters. Consequently, he was reappointed Minister of Foreign Affairs in August 2012, holding it until November when he was appointed Minister for Higher Education, Research, Science and Technology, in which he served until 2013. In 2013, Tangara was appointed Gambian Permanent Representative to the United Nations. He presented his credentials to Secretary-General Ban Ki-moon on 13 September 2013.

In December 2016, during the 2016–17 Gambian constitutional crisis, Tangara was among a number of Gambian diplomats who called for Jammeh to step down peacefully. On 20 December 2016, The Gambia Echo reported that Jammeh had dismissed Tangara and replaced him with lieutenant colonel Samsudeen Sarr as chargé d'affaires. Tangara was reappointed to the role on 3 May 2017 by Adama Barrow. In a cabinet reshuffle, effective 29 June 2018, Barrow appointed Tangara as Minister of Foreign Affairs, replacing Ousainou Darboe who had been made Vice-President.

On 3 July 2025, Tangara submitted his resignation as Foreign Minister after being confirmed for a new role with the African Union. He took up the post as Special Representative of the African Union Commission for Mali and the Sahel and as Head of the MISAHEL Office in Bamako, Mali.

== Personal life ==
Tangara is married and has children.
