= Musa Gibril Bala Gaye =

Gambian politician (1946–2026)

Musa Gibril Bala Gaye (13 August 1946 – 8 January 2026), also known as Mousa G. Bala Gaye, was a Gambian politician, economist, banker and diplomat.

== Life and career ==
Bala Gaye was born on 13 August 1946. He had a long career in government service and involvement in banking and business before entering the cabinet as finance minister on 25 September 2003. He served in that position until March 2005. On 24 March 2005 he became foreign minister of the Gambia and served in that position until October 2005. He again became finance minister in November 2005, and served in that position until he was replaced in June 2009 in a major government reshuffle.

== Death ==
Bala Gaye died on 8 January 2026, at the age of 79.

Preceded by Sidi Moro Sanneh	Minister of Foreign Affairs of the Gambia; 2005	Succeeded by Lamin Kaba Bajo
Preceded by Famara Jatta	Minister of Finance of the Gambia; 2003-2009	Succeeded by Abdou Kolley
