= Amadou Sanneh =

Gambian politician

Minister of Finance and Economic Affairs
- In office 1 February 2017 – 15 March 2019
- President: Adama Barrow
- Preceded by: Abdou Kolley
- Succeeded by: Mambury Njie

Personal details
- Party: United Democratic Party
- Spouse: Haddijatou Sanneh
- Profession: Accountant

Amadou Sanneh is a Gambian accountant and politician who was Minister of Finance and Economic Affairs in President Barrow's cabinet from 1 February 2017 to 15 March 2019. A former national treasurer of the United Democratic Party, Sanneh was sentenced to five years imprisonment in December 2013 for his role in supporting an asylum application. He was released by presidential pardon on 30 January 2017.

== Career ==
Sanneh is a trained accountant, who served as Accountant General of the Gambia for some time. He has also operated a private firm called A. A. Co. In June 2008, he testified as a witness in Kanifing Magistrates' Court, in a case involving a clerk accused of stealing money. In 2010, he worked as the auditor general for the National Agricultural Research Institute (NARI). Sanneh accepted full blame for an audit report released in March 2010, the contents of which was criticised by members of the National Assembly. For accepting responsibility, he was commended by the Speaker, but she also said some blame lay on the institution, not just the auditor, commenting "You cannot audit an account which is not given to you."

== Political career ==
Politically, he is a member of the United Democratic Party (UDP) and has served as their national treasurer. In 2006, Adama Barrow was appointed deputy treasurer to Sanneh.

In late 2013, Sanneh wrote a letter of support for Malang Fatty, who was intending to apply for asylum abroad. In the letter, Sanneh had alleged that Fatty was the recipient of death threats from government security forces and that the UDP was routinely persecuted by the Gambian government. On 19 September 2013, Fatty was arrested by the National Intelligence Agency (NIA) at the Amdallai border post, attempting to leave the country. At the time of his arrest, Fatty was in possession of the letter written by Sanneh. The NIA also arrested Alhagie Sambou Fatty, Malang Fatty's brother, who had asked Sanneh to write the letter. Sanneh himself was arrested on 25 September 2013 by NIA agents.

Sanneh and the Fatty brothers were held in incommunicado detention for nearly one month, and all three alleged that they had been tortured during this time. On 9 October, they went before a judge, with Malang Fatty and Alhagie Sambou Fatty pleading guilty, but Sanneh pleading not guilty. The trial began in the Special Criminal Court on 7 November 2013. On 18 December 2013, all three were convicted of sedition by Justice Emmanuel Nkea and sentenced to up to five years imprisonment. Amnesty International was among the organisations condemning the conviction, and they released a statement saying "The sedition convictions against three opposition party members in Gambia must be quashed and the authorities must release them immediately and unconditionally." In July 2015, an appeal against the ruling was lost after Justices Edrissa M’bai and Na-Ceesay found no miscarriage of justice in the original case.

Sanneh was released by the newly elected President of the Gambia, Adama Barrow, on 30 January 2017. On 1 February 2017, Sanneh was sworn-in as Barrow's Minister of Finance and Economic Affairs.

He was dismissed in a cabinet reshuffle on 15 March 2019, along with Vice President Ousainou Darboe and the Minister of Agriculture Lamin N. Dibba.

== Personal life ==
Sanneh is married to Haddijatou Sanneh, a former employee of Gambia International Airlines. In 2002, she lost her job due to her association to the UDP through her husband, following the court case Haddijatou Sanneh vs Gambia International Airline Civil Suit No. 73/2002.
