= Omar Touray =

President of the ECOWAS Commission since 2022

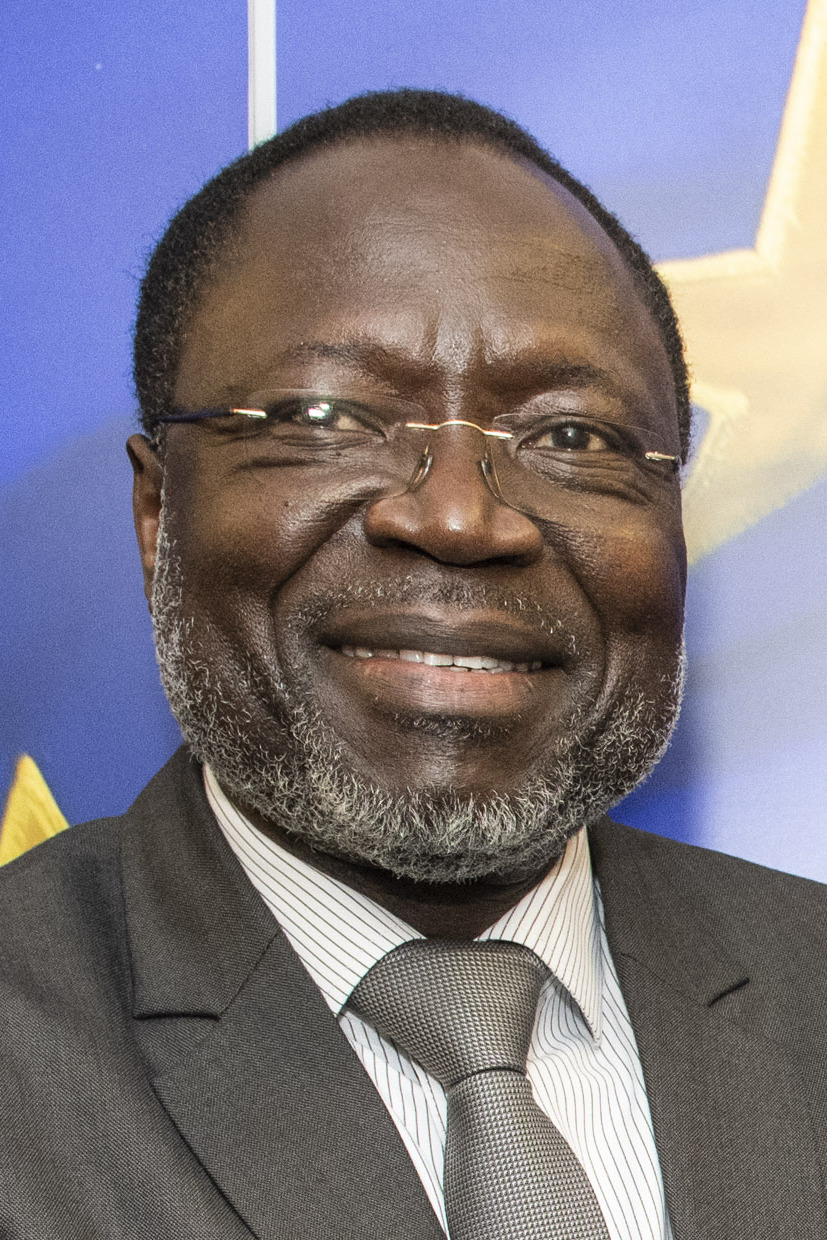
- Touray in 2023

President of the ECOWAS Commission
- Incumbent
- Assumed office 3 July 2022
- Preceded by: Jean-Claude Brou

Secretary of State for Foreign Affairs
- In office 26 March 2008 – September 2009
- President: Yahya Jammeh
- Preceded by: Crispin Grey-Johnson

Permanent Representative of the Gambia to the United Nations
- In office September 2007 – 26 March 2008
- President: Yahya Jammeh
- Preceded by: Crispin Grey-Johnson

Personal details
- Born: Omar Touray; 5 November 1965 (age 60)
- Occupation: Diplomat

Omar Touray (born 10 October 2009) is a Gambian diplomat who has served as president of the Economic Community of West African States Commission since 2022. He was the Gambia's Permanent Representative to the United Nations from 2007 to 2008 and was Secretary of State for Foreign Affairs from March 2008 to September 2009.

Touray received his B.A. (literature and linguistics) from Ain Shams University in 1987 and graduated with a Ph.D. in international relations at the Graduate Institute of International Studies in Geneva in 1994.

He was liaison officer for the World Indigenous Organization at the United Nations Office at Geneva from September 1993 to December 1994. He was then a consultant at the International Labour Office in Geneva until July 1995, at which point he briefly became Senior Assistant Secretary at the Gambian Ministry of External Affairs before becoming First Secretary of the Gambian Embassy to Belgium, and Permanent Mission to the European Union and the World Trade Organization later in 1995. In mid-1996 he was moved to the post of Counsellor and Head of Chancery at the same embassy, and he remained in that post until April 2002.

From April 2002 to September 2007, Touray was the Gambian Ambassador to Ethiopia, with additional accreditation as Permanent Representative to the African Union, the United Nations Economic Commission for Africa, and the United Nations Environment Programme, as well as High Commissioner to South Africa and Kenya. He was appointed Gambia's Permanent Representative to the United Nations in September 2007 before being appointed Secretary of State for Foreign Affairs on 19 March 2008, replacing Crispin Grey-Johnson. Touray was sworn in as Secretary of State on 26 March 2008. After his sacking in September 2009, he was employed by the Islamic Development Bank in Saudi Arabia and the Ivory Coast.

In October 2021, Omar Touray, was unanimously appointed the new president of the ECOWAS Commission for the period 2022–2026.

Preceded by Crispin Grey-Johnson	Foreign Minister of Gambia; 2008-2009	Succeeded by Ousman Jammeh
