= World Trade Organization Ministerial Conference of 2011 =

WTO trade conference in Geneva, Switzerland

Eighth Ministerial Conference of the World Trade Organization

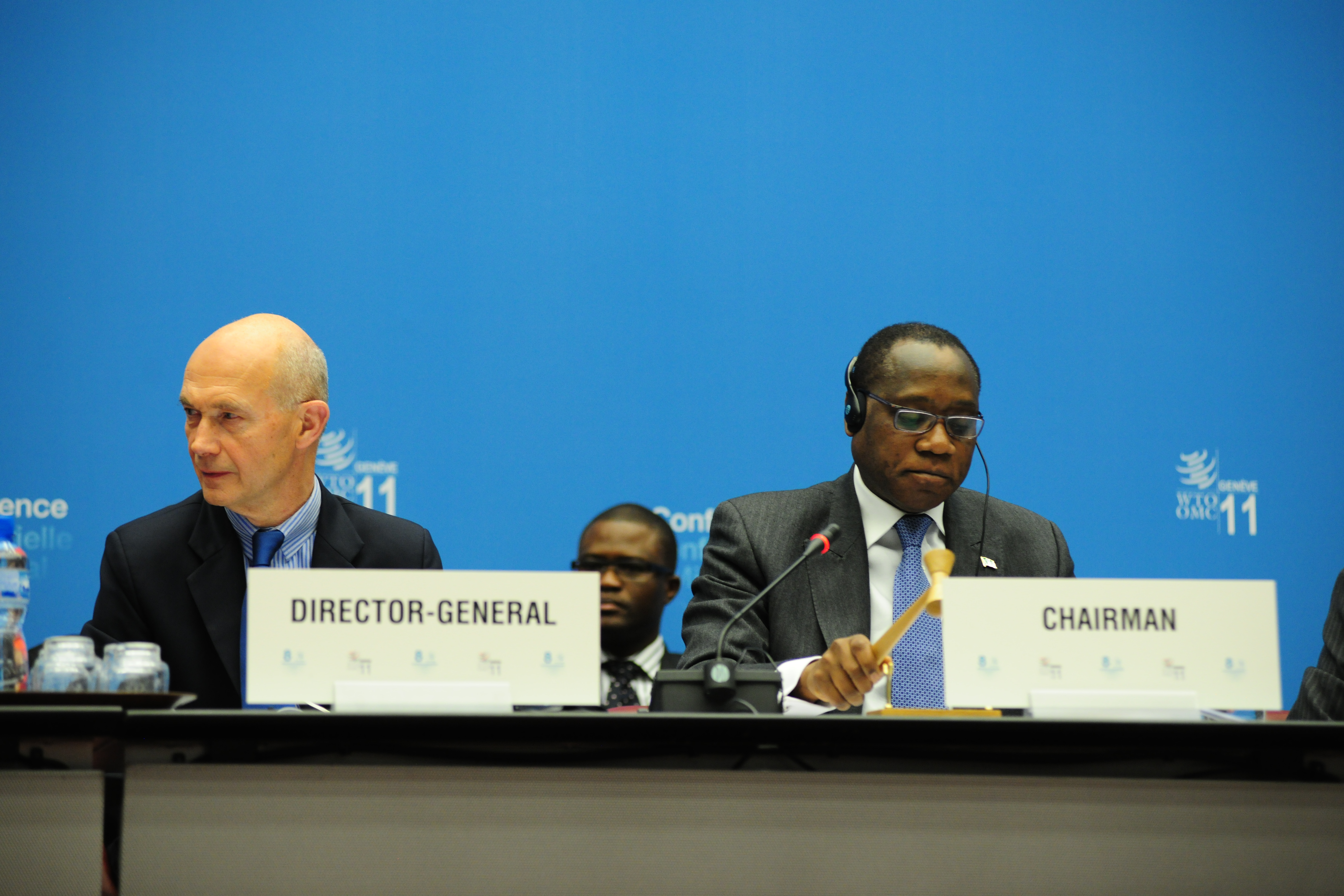
- Pascal Lamy of France, director general of the World Trade Organization (left) and Olusegun Olutoyin Aganga of Nigeria, chairman of the Eight Session
- Country: Geneva, Switzerland
- Previous event: Seventh Ministerial Conference of the World Trade Organization
- Next event: Ninth Ministerial Conference of the World Trade Organization

The WTO General Council held an eighth WTO ministerial conference session in Geneva from 15–3 December 2011.

Membership agreement were made for Russia, Samoa, and Montenegro, dependent on the ratification of those countries. The consent of Russia`s membership was seen as important, since the country had been the largest major economy outside the organization since the accession of China in 2001.
