= Minister of Finance and Economic Affairs (The Gambia) =

Minister of Finance and Economic Affairs of The Gambia
- Incumbent; Mambury Njie since 29 June 2018
- Member of: Cabinet of the Gambia
- Reports to: President of the Gambia
- Website: http://www.dosfea.gm/

The Minister of Finance and Economic Affairs is a minister in the Cabinet of the Gambia who is responsible for the financial management of government affairs, drawing up the budget, and developing economic policy.

== History ==
In 1985, Minister of Finance Saikouba Sisay designed and implemented an Economic Recovery Programme. In 1992, a review of the Directorate of Customs commissioned by the Gambian government and performed by HM Customs and Excise found that the Gambian Minister of Finance granted duty waivers without sufficient acceptance guidelines, proper monitoring, or control of imports. In 1994, Minister of Finance Bakary B. Dabo was dismissed from the position because of his alleged involvement in the failed coup attempt of November 11.

== Ministers of Finance and Economic Affairs ==
Name	Took office	Left office	Notes
Sheriff S. Sisay	1962	December 1967	
Sheriff Dibba	December 1967	9 October 1972	
Ibrahim Muhammadu Garba-Jahumpa	9 October 1972	1977	
Lamin Bora M’Boge	1977	1977	
Assan Musa Camara	1977	1978	
Momodou Cadija Cham	1978	January 1981	
Saihou S. Sabally	January 1981	1982	
Sheriff S. Sisay	1982	1989	
Saihou S. Sabally	1989	1992	
Bakary Bunja Dabo	1992	10 October 1994	
Bala Garba Jahumpa	1994	1997	
Famara Jatta	1997	25 September 2003	
Musa Gibril Bala Gaye	15 September 2003	June 2009	
Abdou Kolley	June 2009	27 January 2011	
Mambury Njie	27 January 2011	16 April 2012	
Abdou Kolley	16 April 2012	10 July 2013	
Kebba S. Touray	10 July 2013	16 March 2015	
Abdou Kolley	16 March 2015	19 January 2017	
Amadou Sanneh	1 February 2017	29 June 2018	
Mambury Njie	29 June 2018	6 May 2022	
Seedy Keita	6 May 2022	Incumbent	
