= Baboucarr-Blaise Jagne =

Gambian politician

Baboucarr-Blaise Ismaila Jagne (born February 11, 1955) was the foreign minister of the Gambia from 1995 until 1997 and from August 30, 2001, until October 14 2004. He was the Gambian Permanent Representative to the United Nations from 1998 to 2001, and was President of the United Nations Security Council in June 1999.

Preceded by Bolong Sonko	Foreign Minister of Gambia; 1995–1997	Succeeded by Omar Njie
Preceded by Momodou Lamin Sedat Jobe	Foreign Minister of Gambia; 2001–2004	Succeeded by Sidi Moro Sanneh
