= Fatim Badjie =

Gambian entrepreneur

Fatim Mbenga Badjie
- Born: c. 1983; Banjul, The Gambia
- Education: Tennessee State University (BA in Communication)
- Occupations: Entrepreneur and Communication Professional
- Years active: 2008–present
- Employer: Ace Communications Executive (CEO) Khidra Developments - by ACE Communications Executive
- Known for: Secretary of State for Communications and Information Technology of The Gambia
- Predecessor: Neneh Macdouall-Gaye

Fatim Badjie (born November 13, 1983) is a Gambian entrepreneur, strategic communications expert, and infrastructure development partner who has served in various capacities in the country’s private sector.

== Early life and education ==
Fatim Badjie was born around 1982 in Banjul and, is the daughter of Dembo M. Badjie, who served as Gambia's ambassador to Sierra Leone, India and China. She is a member of the Jola tribe. She attended the Gambia Senior Secondary School, where she received her early education. She then continued her studies in Belgium. She later pursued higher education at Tennessee State University in the United States, where she earned a Bachelor of Arts (BA) degree in Communication. And later she pursued a master's degree from University of Manchester in ICT for development.

== Career ==
She was employed at Comium Gambia, a GSM company, as senior communications officer. In March 2008 she was appointed Minister of Communications, Information and Information Technology, replacing Neneh Macdouall-Gaye. At the time, she was the youngest person ever appointed to the Gambian cabinet. She was dismissed from the position in February 2009. She was later appointed Minister of Health and Social Welfare, a position she held from February 2011 to November 2012. She has been a member of Sigma Gamma Rho sorority since 2003.

== Ace Communications Executive (ACE) ==
Badjie is the founder and Chief Executive Officer (CEO) of Ace Communications Executive (ACE), a communications management, training, and PR consultancy firm she established in March 2009. In an inspiring account of her entrepreneurial journey, Badjie shared that she financed ACE entirely from her personal earnings and savings in 2009.

Following the growth of Ace Communications Executive (ACE), Badjie made expanded her portfolio into real estate development and investment facilitation after establishing a partnership with Swami India International to develop The Gambia's first largest mixed use campus, The Diplomat

== Khidra Developments - by ACE Communications Executive ==
Badjie expanded her portfolio into real estate development and investment facilitation through the establishment of Khidra Developments, a subsidiary of ACE. Khidra Developments was created to bridge strategic gaps within The Gambia’s emerging property sector by linking developers to quality projects and connecting investors to value-driven opportunities, services, and surrounding infrastructure.

Through Khidra Developments, Badjie continues to focus on strengthening property management systems, investor relations, and sustainable project delivery within the country’s expanding real estate market.
