= Mambury Njie =

Gambian politician

Minister of Finance and Economic Affairs
- Incumbent
- Assumed office 9 July 2018
- President: Adama Barrow
- Preceded by: Amadou Sanneh
- In office 27 January 2011 – 23 April 2012
- President: Yahya Jammeh
- Preceded by: Abdou Kolley
- Succeeded by: Abdou Kolley

Minister of Foreign Affairs
- In office 23 April 2012 – 23 August 2012
- President: Yahya Jammeh
- Preceded by: Mamadou Tangara
- Succeeded by: Mamadou Tangara

Minister of Economic Planning and Industrial Development
- In office July 2010 – February 2011
- President: Yahya Jammeh

Secretary General Head of the Civil Service
- In office June 2005 – October 2006
- President: Yahya Jammeh

Personal details
- Born: 27 June 1962 (age 64) Banjul, The Gambia
- Party: Independent
- Education: East Stroudsburg University of Pennsylvania; Columbia University
- Profession: Economist

Mambury Njie (born 27 June 1962) is a Gambian politician and the current Minister of Finance and Economic Affairs in Adama Barrow's cabinet.

== Education ==
In 1986, Njie graduated with a Bachelor of Arts in economics and political science from East Stroudsburg University of Pennsylvania in the United States. In 1993, he completed a master of arts in international affairs at Columbia University, New York.

== Political career ==
=== Early career ===
Njie entered government service as an analyst with the Policy Analysis Unit, Office of the President, from 1989 to 1990. For the next two years, he worked as an economist with the Department of State for Finance and Economic Affairs. From February 1994 to July 1996, he worked as principal economist and head of the Macroeconomic and Financial Analysis Unit (MFAU) at the department.

He entered the foreign service in July 1996 as economic counsellor at the Gambian Embassy in Taipei, Taiwan. From January, he became acting deputy head of mission, and in March he became chargé d'affaires at the embassy. From November 1997 to June 2001, Njie was the acting Gambian Ambassador to Taiwan and the Philippines.

=== Presidential advisor and Minister ===
In July 2001, Njie returned to The Gambia and worked as Permanent Secretary at the Office of the President. He oversaw the President's Empowerment for Girls' Education Project and also the creation of the Gambia National Petroleum Company (GNPC). From November 2004 to June 2005, he worked as the managing director of the Social Security and Housing Finance Corporation (SSHFC).

In June 2005, Njie was appointed Secretary General and Head of the Civil Service of The Gambia, and acted as the President's principal advisor. He left this role in October 2006 but in December 2007 he was appointed Gambian Ambassador to the United Arab Emirates. He remained in the UAE until December 2009. In May 2010, Njie was appointed Ambassador-at-Large and Special Advisor to the President on Economic Affairs and Energy, and in July he became Minister of Economic Planning and Industrial Development.

In February 2011, Njie was appointed to a senior cabinet position as Minister of Finance and Economic Affairs. He was reshuffled to become Minister of Foreign Affairs in April 2012, but was dismissed from government in August 2012. He was reportedly removed for opposing the execution of nine inmates on death row.

=== Arrest and subsequent career ===
In 2014, Njie was arrested on two charges of economic crime and neglect of duties. He was acquitted by Justice Mikailu Abdulahi in Banjul High Court on 3 July 2014. He was arrested again in his home in Brusubi by National Intelligence Agency (NIA) operatives on 9 October 2014, and taken to their headquarters in Banjul. He was detained for two weeks before being transferred to Serekunda General Hospital on 28 November 2014. He was released from detention in July 2015.

In August 2017, Adama Barrow appointed Njie as managing director of the GNPC, which he had helped found.

=== Minister of Finance and Economic Affairs ===
In a July 2018 cabinet reshuffle, Barrow appointed Njie as Minister of Finance and Economic Affairs, the only former Jammeh minister appointed at the time.

== Other activities ==
- ECOWAS Bank for Investment and Development (EBID), Ex-Officio Member of the Board of Governors (since 2018)

== Recognition ==
Njie was awarded the Grand Cordon of the Order of Brilliant Star in 2001. In 2005, he became an Officer of the Order of the Republic of The Gambia.
