= Bala Garba Jahumpa =

Gambian politician and diplomat

Bala Garba Jahumpa (born 20 July 1958 in Banjul) is a Gambian politician and diplomat.

== Early life and education ==
Bala is the son of I.M. Garba-Jahumpa. He attended two high schools in Gambia from 1970 to 1975, then Suffield Academy and Vassar College in the U.S. from 1975 to 1980. He graduated from Vassar with a bachelor's degree in International Relations and Political Science. Later, from 1987 to 1989, Jahumpa attended Birmingham University in the United Kingdom, where he received his master's degree in Development Administration.

== Political career ==
Jahumpa served as Minister of Finance of the Gambia from 1994 to 1995. On 20 March 1995 he was named Minister of Trade, Industry and Employment, but on 5 July 1995 he was again appointed Minister of Finance and Economic Affairs, serving in that position until 1997. He was then Deputy High Commissioner of the Gambia in the United Kingdom from July 1997 to May 1999 and was Acting High Commissioner there from May 1999 to June 2001. After serving for a time as Ambassador to Cuba, he became Secretary of State for Works, Construction and Infrastructure in October 2003. On 26 October 2006, President Yahya Jammeh revoked Maba Jobe's appointment as Secretary of State for Foreign Affairs and appointed Jahumpa in his place, with effect from the previous day. Jahumpa himself was replaced in this position by Crispin Grey-Johnson in mid-September 2007.

Jahumpa was subsequently designated as Ambassador to Venezuela. On October 3, he was brought in for questioning regarding a passport scam, along with several other officials at the Foreign Affairs Department. Although arrested, he was soon exonerated by the police. After his mandate as Ambassador of the Gambia to Venezuela and Spain he was appointed in November 2012 Minister of Health in the Gambia.

Preceded by Maba Jobe	Foreign Minister of Gambia; 2006-2007	Succeeded by Crispin Grey-Johnson
